= Jeanne Hugo =

French socialite of the Belle Époque

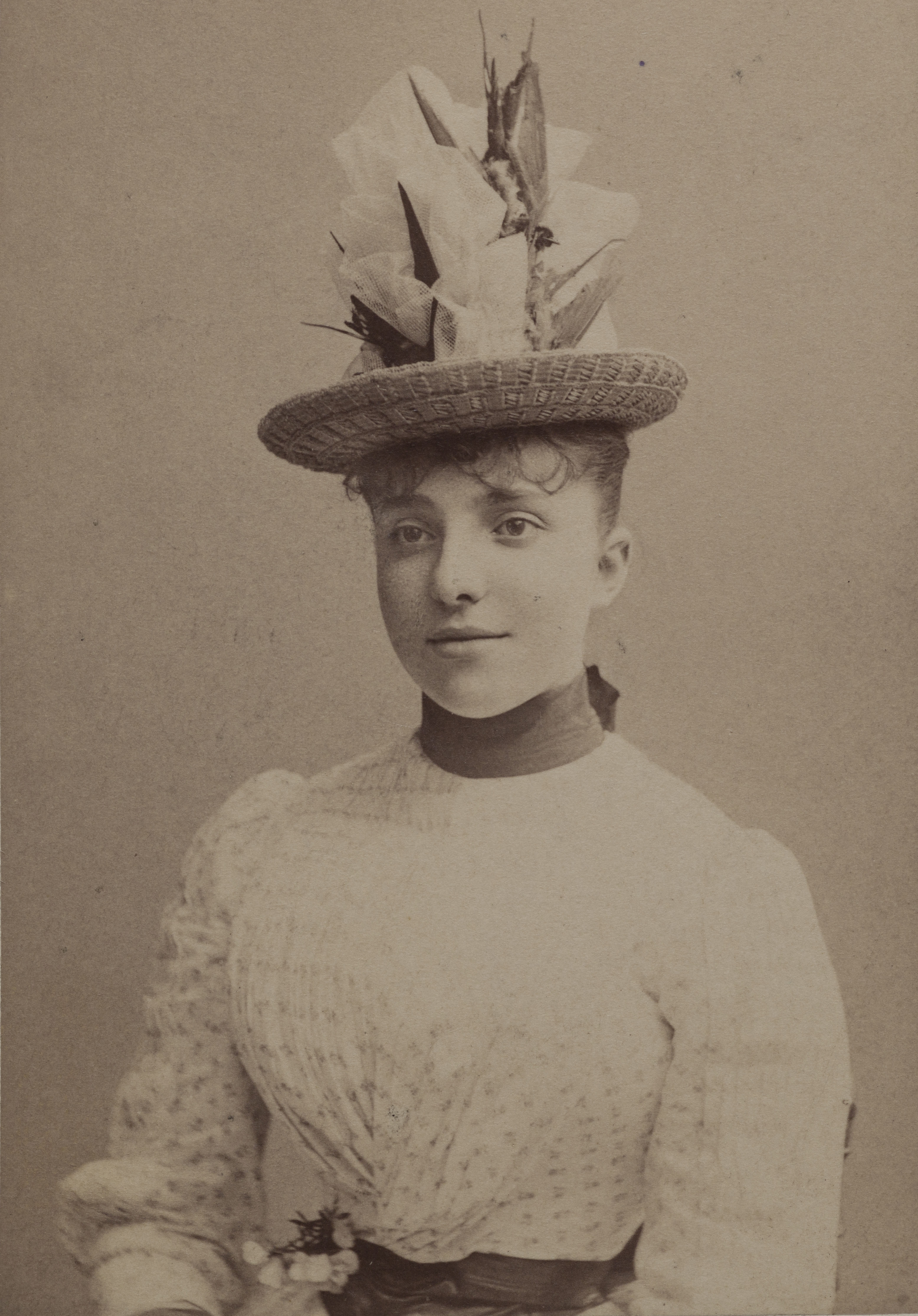
- Hugo in 1890
- Born: Léopoldine Clémence Adèle Lucie Jeanne Hugo; 29 September 1869; Brussels, Kingdom of Belgium
- Died: 30 November 1941 (aged 72); 16th Arrondissement, Paris; France
- Resting place: Cimetière de Passy
- Known for: granddaughter of Victor Hugo
- Spouse(s): Léon Daudet (m. 1891; div. 1895) Jean-Baptiste Charcot (m. 1896; div. 1905) Michel Negroponte (m. 1906; died 1914)
- Parent(s): Charles Hugo; Alice Le Haene

Léopoldine Clémence Adèle Lucie Jeanne Hugo (French pronunciation: [leɔpɔldin klemɑ̃s adɛl lysi ʒan yɡo]; 29 September 1869 – 30 November 1941) was a Belgian-born French heiress and socialite during La Belle Époque. She was a granddaughter of French novelist, poet, and politician Victor Hugo. As an adult, Hugo was often written about in the press due to her status in Parisian high society and her connections to other members of the French elite.

== Early life and family ==
Jeanne Hugo was born in Brussels on 29 September 1869, the third child of the journalist Charles Hugo and his wife Alice Le Haene. Her eldest brother died as an infant prior to her birth. Her surviving older brother was the artist Georges Victor-Hugo. Her paternal grandparents were the writer and politician Victor Hugo and Adèle Foucher. She was a great-granddaughter of Joseph Léopold Sigisbert Hugo and Sophie Trébuchet. A member of a prominent literary and political family, her paternal grandfather had been ennobled as a Pairie de France by Louis Philippe I in 1845. Born in the last year of the Second French Empire, Hugo was raised in a staunch Republican household. Her family, former loyalists to the Bourbon monarchy, opposed the Bonapartes. She was the niece of Léopoldine Hugo, François-Victor Hugo, and Adèle Hugo.

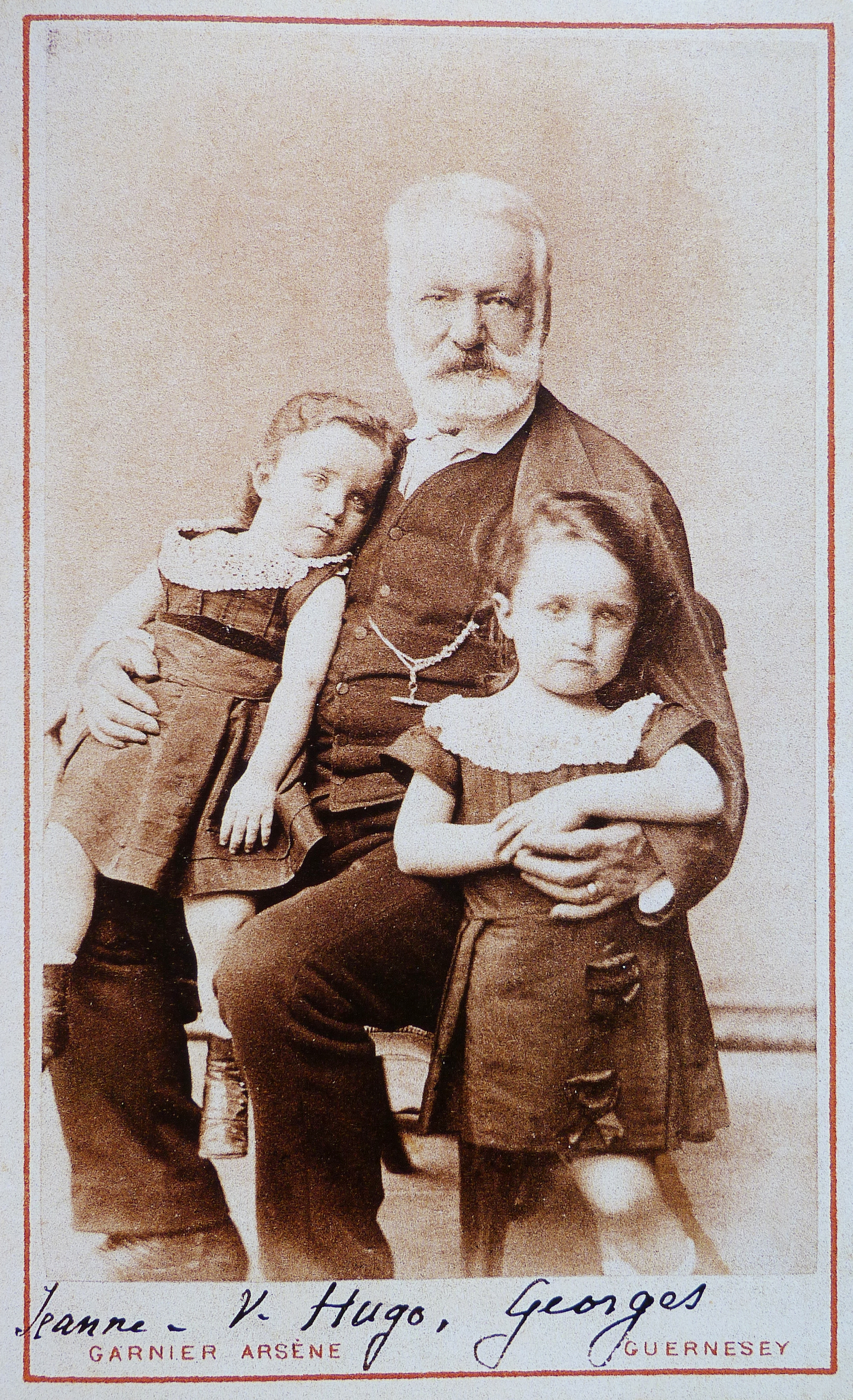
Jeanne with her grandfather and brother in 1872.

In 1871 Hugo's father died from a stroke. Her mother later remarried the actor Édouard Lockroy. Hugo's grandfather did not approve of the new marriage, and took custody of Hugo and her brother, Georges. In 1877 she and her brother were the focus of her grandfather's book of poetry titled L'Art d'être grand-père. When she was eleven years old, she was gifted a walrus-tusk paper cutter by the Finland-Swedish explorer Baron Adolf Erik Nordenskiöld from his voyage in the Arctic Ocean aboard the SS Vega. Her grandfather died in 1885, leaving her with a vast inheritance.

As a young adult, Hugo became a key figure of Parisian high society during the Belle Époque of the French Third Republic and was frequently written about in newspapers. She was the aunt of the artist Jean Hugo.

== Marriages ==
In 1891 Hugo married the journalist Léon Daudet, the son of writers Alphonse Daudet and Julia Daudet. The marriage was performed in a civil ceremony and not a Catholic mass, out of respect for Hugo's grandfather, who had staunch anti-clerical views. The wedding was a major event in Parisian society, attracting crowds of onlookers. They divorced in 1895 and Hugo was awarded custody of their children, preventing Daudet from seeing them for thirteen years.

In 1896 she married the scientist and explorer Jean-Baptiste Charcot, the son of neurologist Jean-Martin Charcot. He named Hugo Island after her grandfather. She divorced Charcot in 1905 on the grounds of desertion.

In 1906 Hugo married Michel Negroponte, a Greek naval officer. They remained married until his death in 1914.

== Later life ==
In 1927, after the death of her brother, she went to Saint Peter Port, Guernsey to officially donate Hauteville House to the City of Paris. Hauteville had served as her childhood home when living with her grandfather in exile. Hugo died on 30 November 1941 in the 16th arrondissement of Paris.
