= Le Rappel =

French newspaper started by Victor Hugo's sons

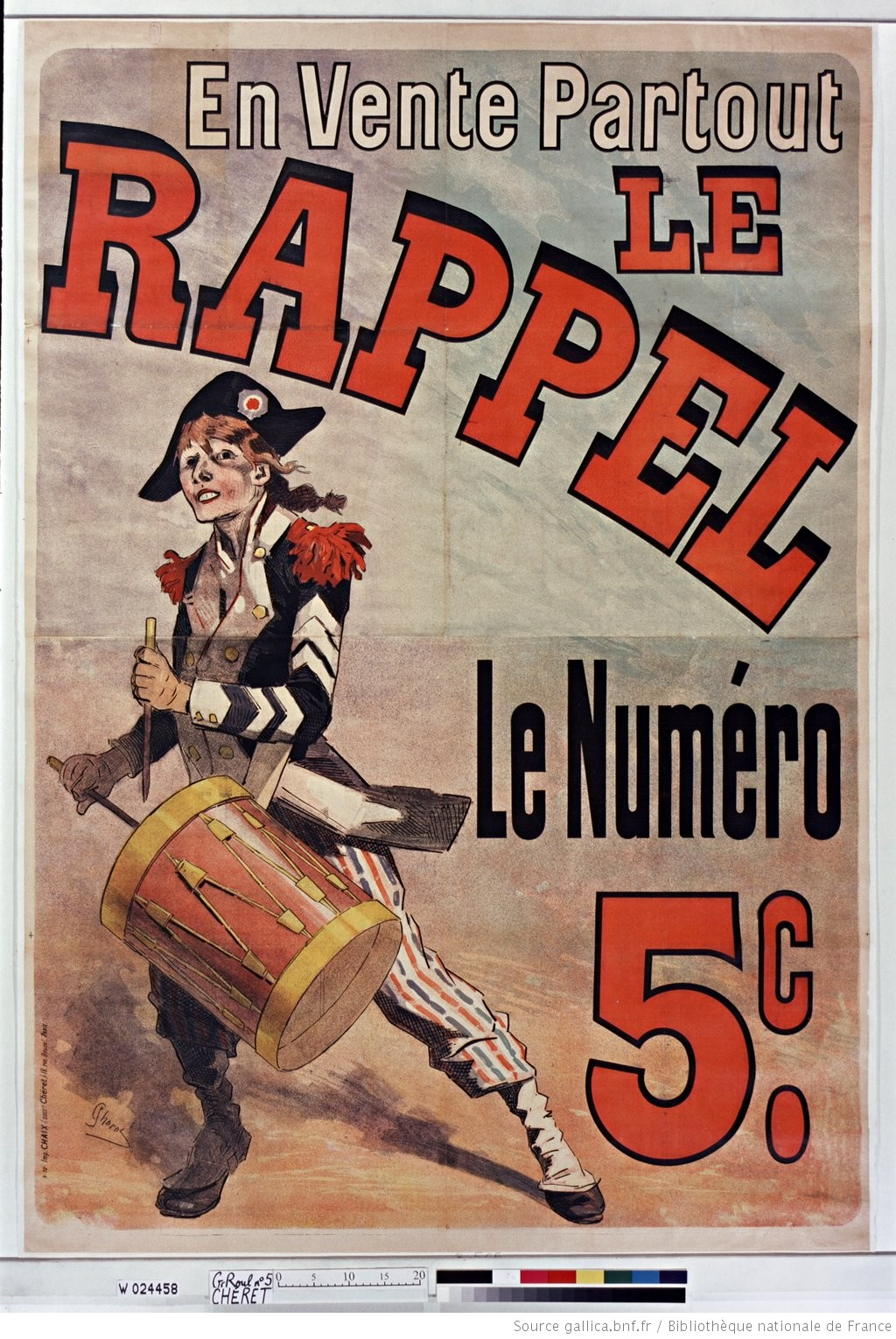
- Type: Daily newspaper
- Format: Broadsheet
- Founders: Charles Hugo; François-Victor Hugo; Auguste Vacquerie; Paul Meurice; Henri Rochefort
- Founded: 4 May 1869
- Ceased publication: 1933
- Political alignment: Republicanism
- Language: French
- Headquarters: Paris
- Country: France

Le Rappel (French for "the Recall") was a French daily newspaper founded in 1869 by Charles and François-Victor Hugo, sons of Victor Hugo, along with Auguste Vacquerie, Paul Meurice, and Henri Rochefort. It was published from the final years of the Second French Empire through the early decades of the French Third Republic, ceasing in 1933.

At the dawn of the Third Republic, the paper became a prominent voice of radical republicanism and was frequently criticised by the authorities for its uncompromising editorial line.

== Publication history ==
Le Rappel was launched on 4 May 1869, following the passage of the 11 May 1868 law that eased press restrictions in the waning years of the Second Empire. The newspaper was founded at the initiative of Victor Hugo, ahead of the general elections of 1869. Its creation reflected his desire to support republican ideals and provide a platform for radical political thought. The founding editors were Hugo's sons, Charles and François-Victor Hugo, along with Auguste Vacquerie, Paul Meurice, and Henri Rochefort.

Victor Hugo contributed directly to the first issue by writing a manifesto addressed to the five co-editors. In it, he described the paper as a moral summons to action and principle:

It is a call. I love the word in every sense. It is the call to principle by conscience; the call to truth by philosophy; the call to duty by right; the call to the dead by reverence; the call to punishment by equity; the call to the past by history; the call to the future by logic; the call to action by courage; the call to idealism by thought; the call to science by experiment; the call to God in religion by the extirpation of idolatry; the call to the people's sovereignty by universal suffrage; the call to humanity by free education; the call to liberty by the awakening of France and by the stirring cry Fiat Jus!

— Victor Hugo,

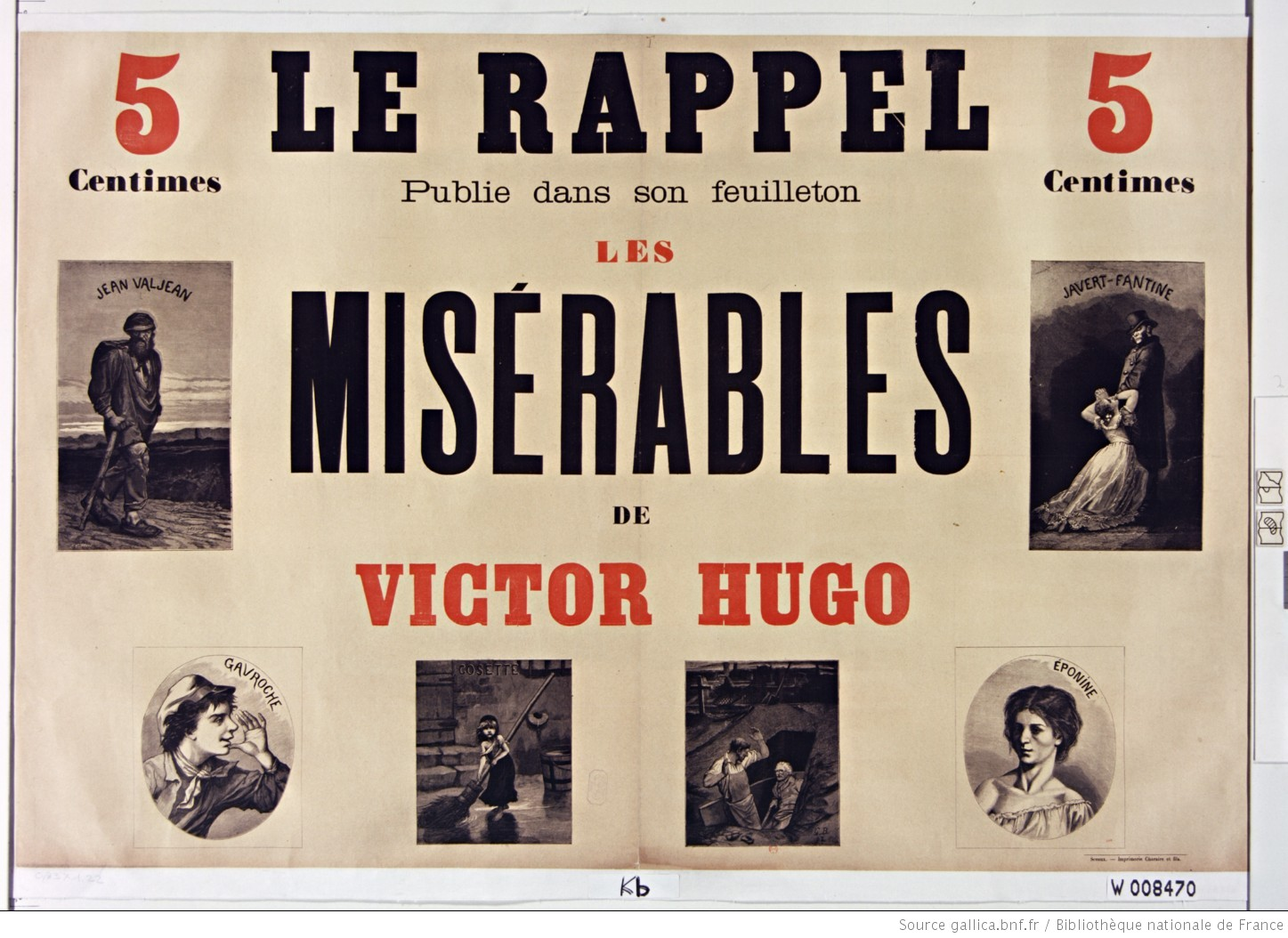
Victor Hugo's Les Misérables serialised in Le Rappel

== Impact and influence ==
During the early years of the French Third Republic, Le Rappel emerged as one of the leading voices of radical republicanism. It was notable for its opposition to authoritarianism, particularly under Napoleon III, and for its outspoken stance on human rights abuses occurring across Europe. Its editorial line frequently drew criticism from the government for its uncompromising political engagement.

On 29 August 1876, Victor Hugo used Le Rappel to publish a powerful editorial titled "Pour la Serbie" ("For Serbia"), in which he condemned the massacres of Serbian civilians by the Ottoman Empire. The article served as both a humanitarian appeal and a political denunciation of European inaction in the face of the atrocities.

In another notable intervention, following the anti-Jewish pogrom in the Russian city of Yelisavetgrad on 27 April 1881, Hugo once again turned to Le Rappel to express his outrage. His editorial denounced the violence and the indifference of European powers, offering one of the earliest condemnations of such acts in the French press.

== Notable contributors ==
Notable contributors have included:

- Arthur Arnould
- Ernest Blum
- Philippe Burty
- Albert Dalimier
- Georges Desplas
- Alfred Gaulier
- Charles Hugo
- François-Victor Hugo
- Édouard Laferrière
- Édouard Lockroy
- Henry Maret
- Adolphe Messimy
- Paul Meurice
- Camille Pelletan
- Louis Puech
- Félix Pyat
- Henri Rochefort
- Théodore Steeg
- Auguste Vacquerie
