= Maison de Victor Hugo =

House of Victor Hugo in Paris, France

Coordinates: 48°51′17.5″N 2°21′58″E

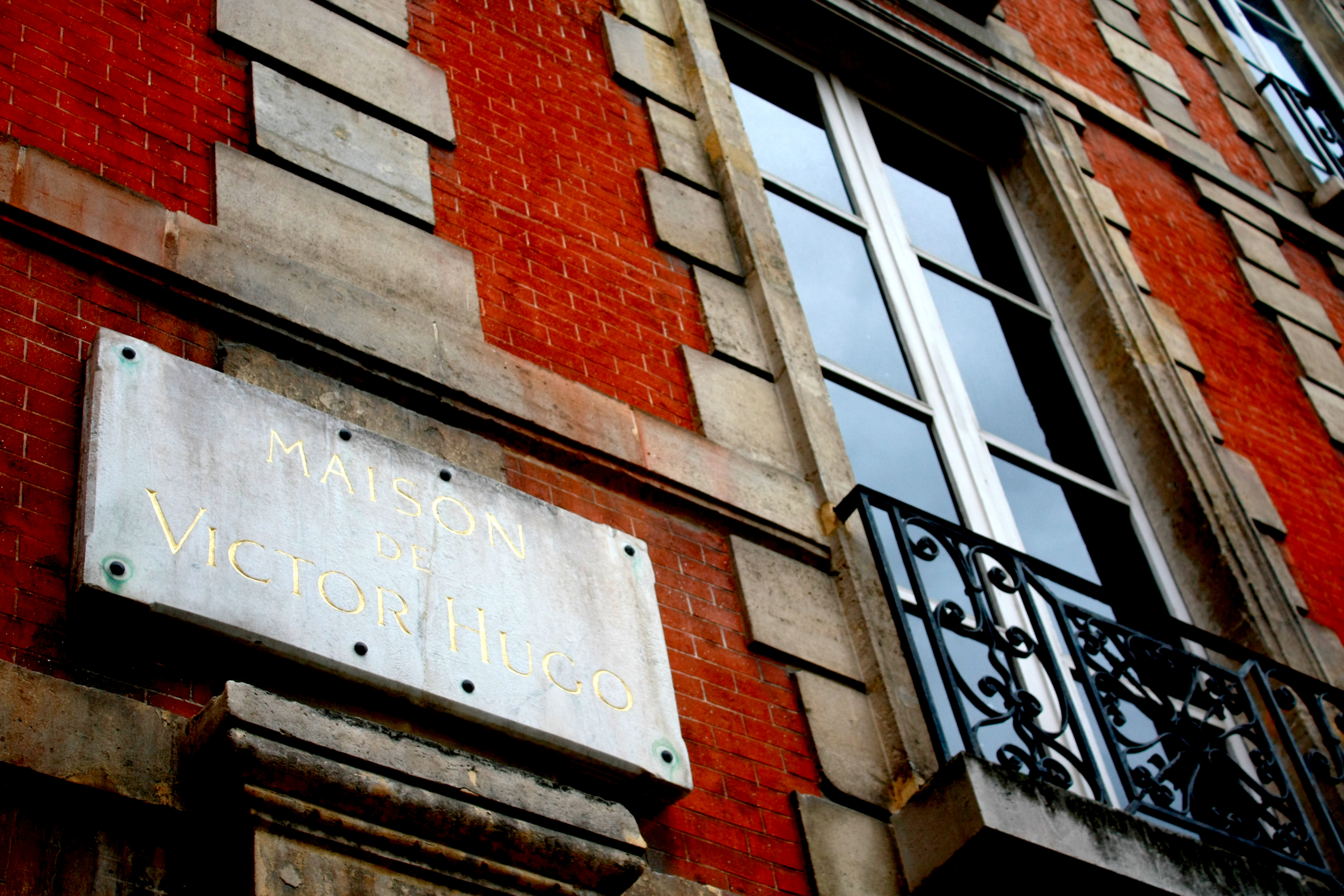
Maison de Victor Hugo

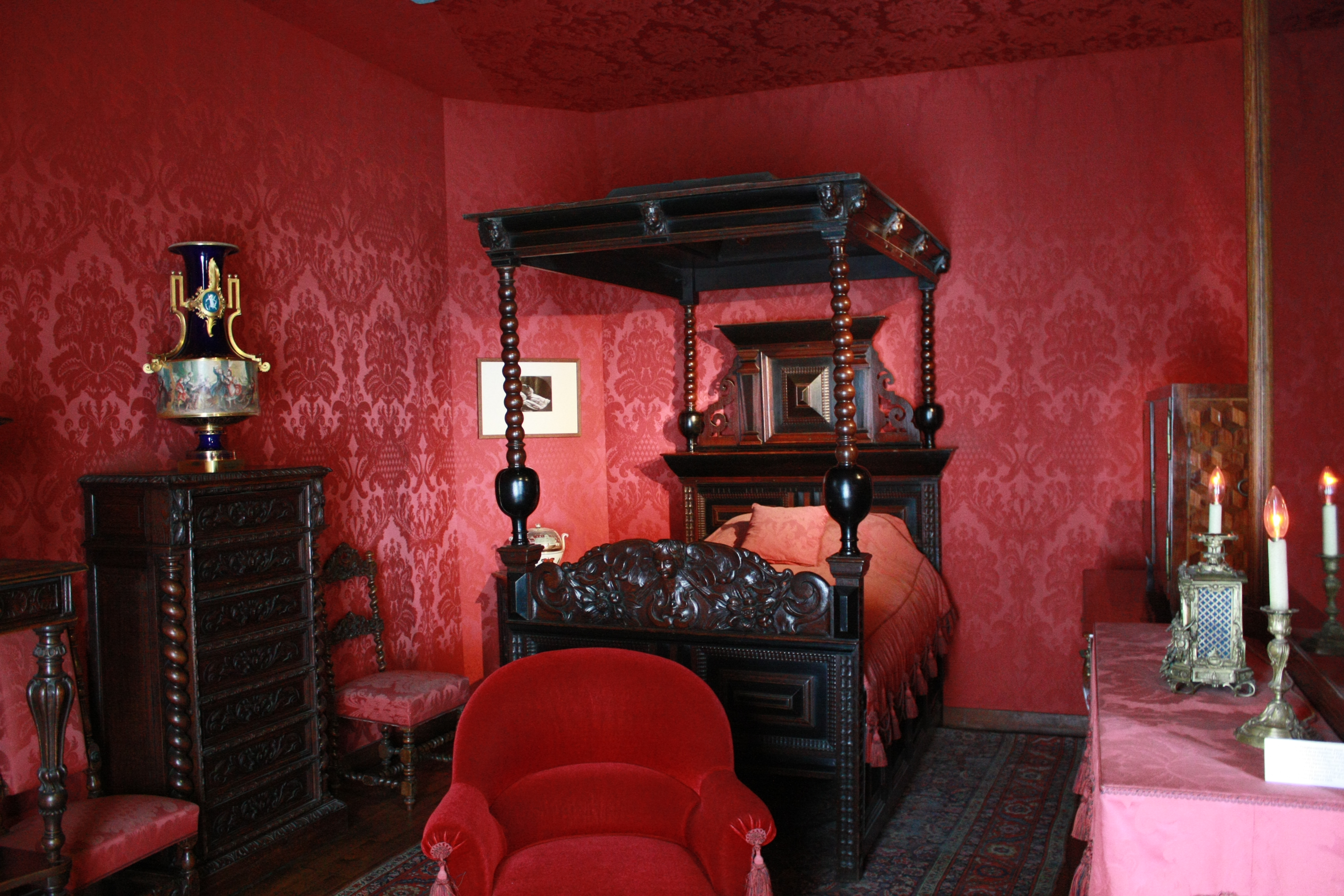
Bedroom where Hugo died

The Maison de Victor Hugo (French pronunciation: [mɛzɔ̃ d(ə) viktɔʁ yɡo]; Victor Hugo's House) is a writer's house museum located in the 4th arrondissement of Paris, where Victor Hugo lived for 16 years between 1832 and 1848. It is one of the fourteen City of Paris museums which have been incorporated since January 1, 2013 in the public institution Paris Musées.

== History ==
The museum is on the Place des Vosges (3rd and 4th arrondissement of Paris) and dates from 1605 when a lot was granted to Isaac Arnauld in the southeast corner of the square. It was substantially improved by the Rohan family, who gave the building its current name of Hôtel de Rohan-Guéménée. Victor Hugo was 30 when he moved into the house in October 1832 with his wife Adèle. They rented a 280 square metre apartment on the second floor. The mansion was converted into a museum when a large donation was made by Paul Meurice to the City of Paris to buy the house.

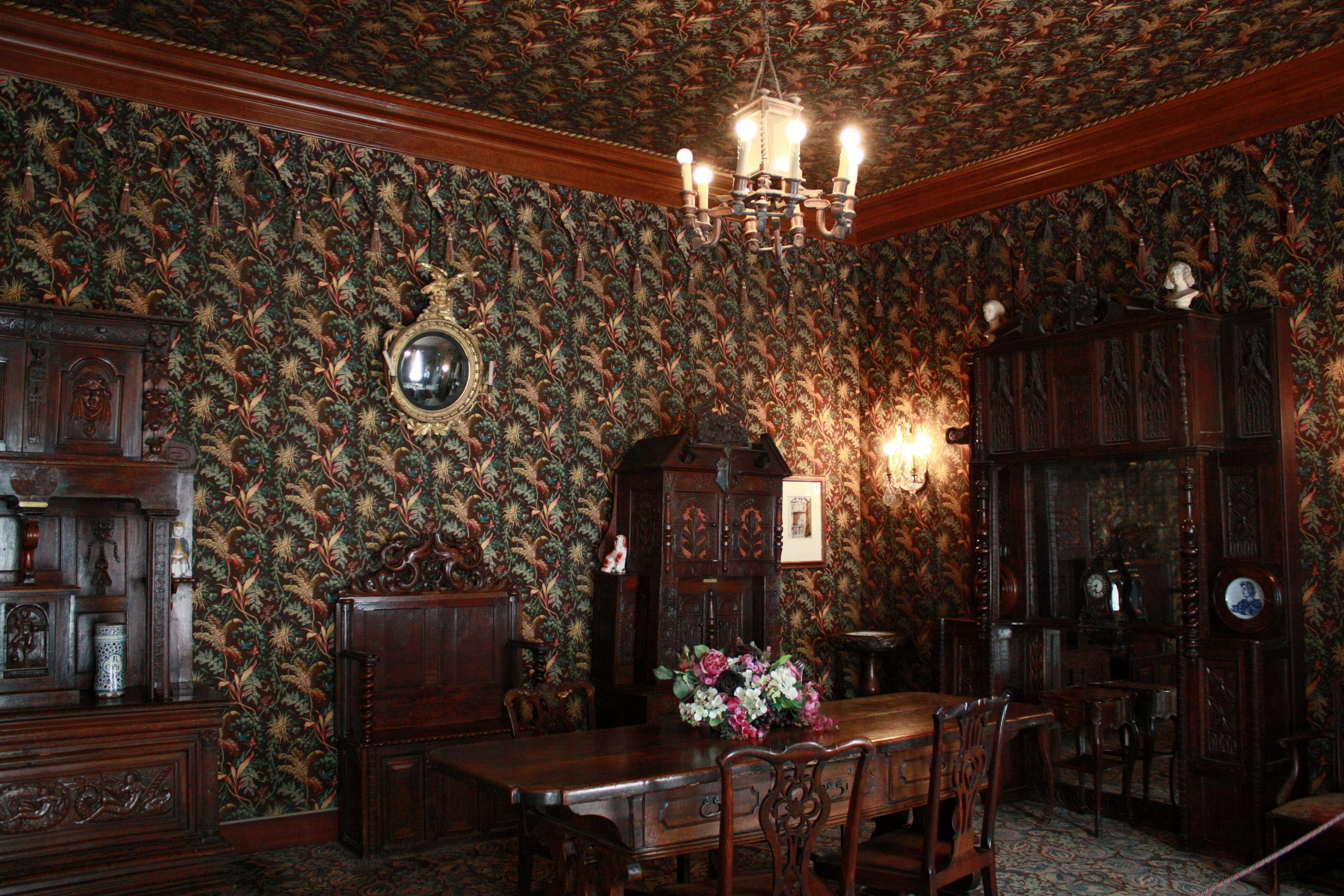
Dining room

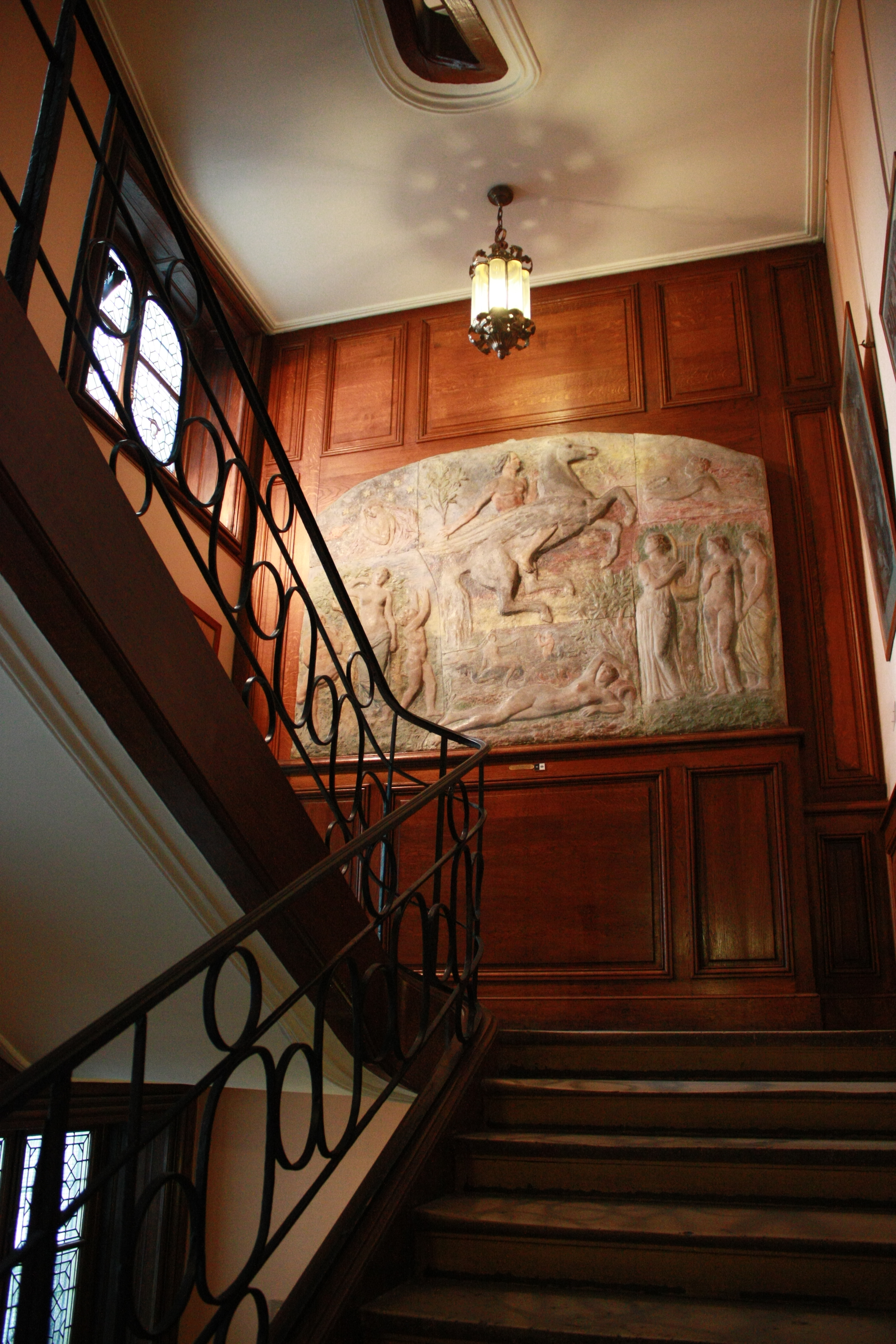
Staircases to the second floor

The museum consists of an antechamber leading through the Chinese living room and medieval style dining room to Victor Hugo's bedroom where he died in 1885.

Victor Hugo's House also manages the Hauteville House, in Guernsey (Channel Islands).

== See also ==
- List of museums in Paris
