= Mount Boland =

Mountain in Graham Land, Antarctica

Coordinates: 65°18′S 63°50′W

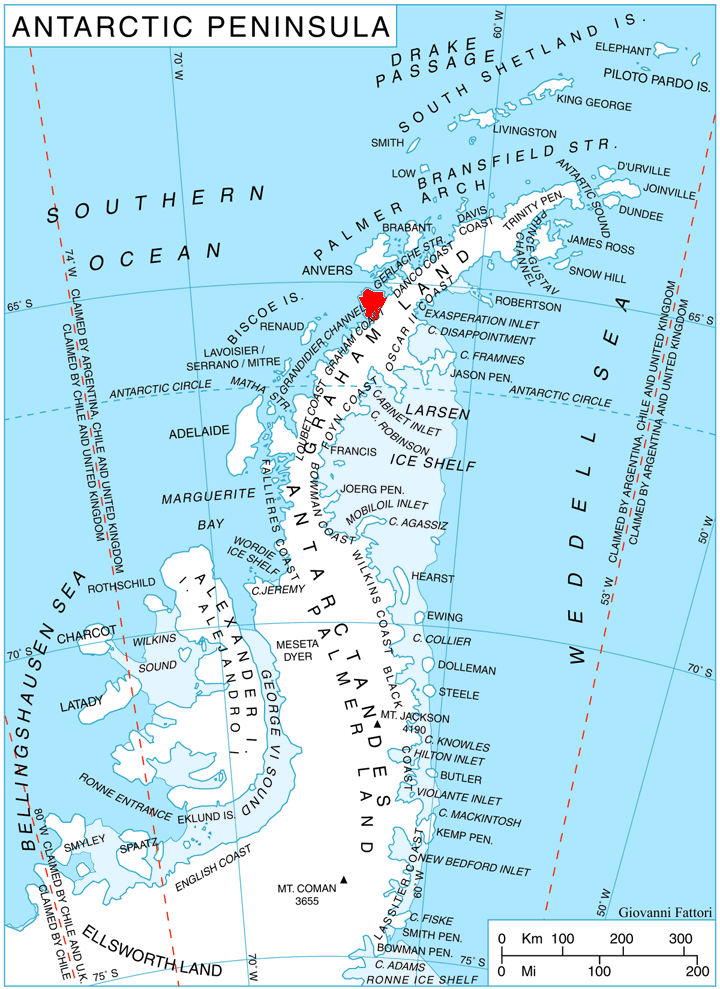
Location of Kyiv Peninsula in Graham Land, Antarctic Peninsula.

Mount Boland is a mountain over 1,065 m on the Kyiv Peninsula in Graham Land, Antarctica. It is six nautical miles (11 km) east of Lumiere Peak on the east–west ridge between Bussey and Trooz Glaciers. It was discovered by the French Antarctic Expedition of 1908–1910 under Charcot and named by him for a Monsieur Boland, a seaman and later a lieutenant on the Pourquoi-Pas, Charcot's ship.
