= Jean-Pierre Granger =

French painter (1779–1840)

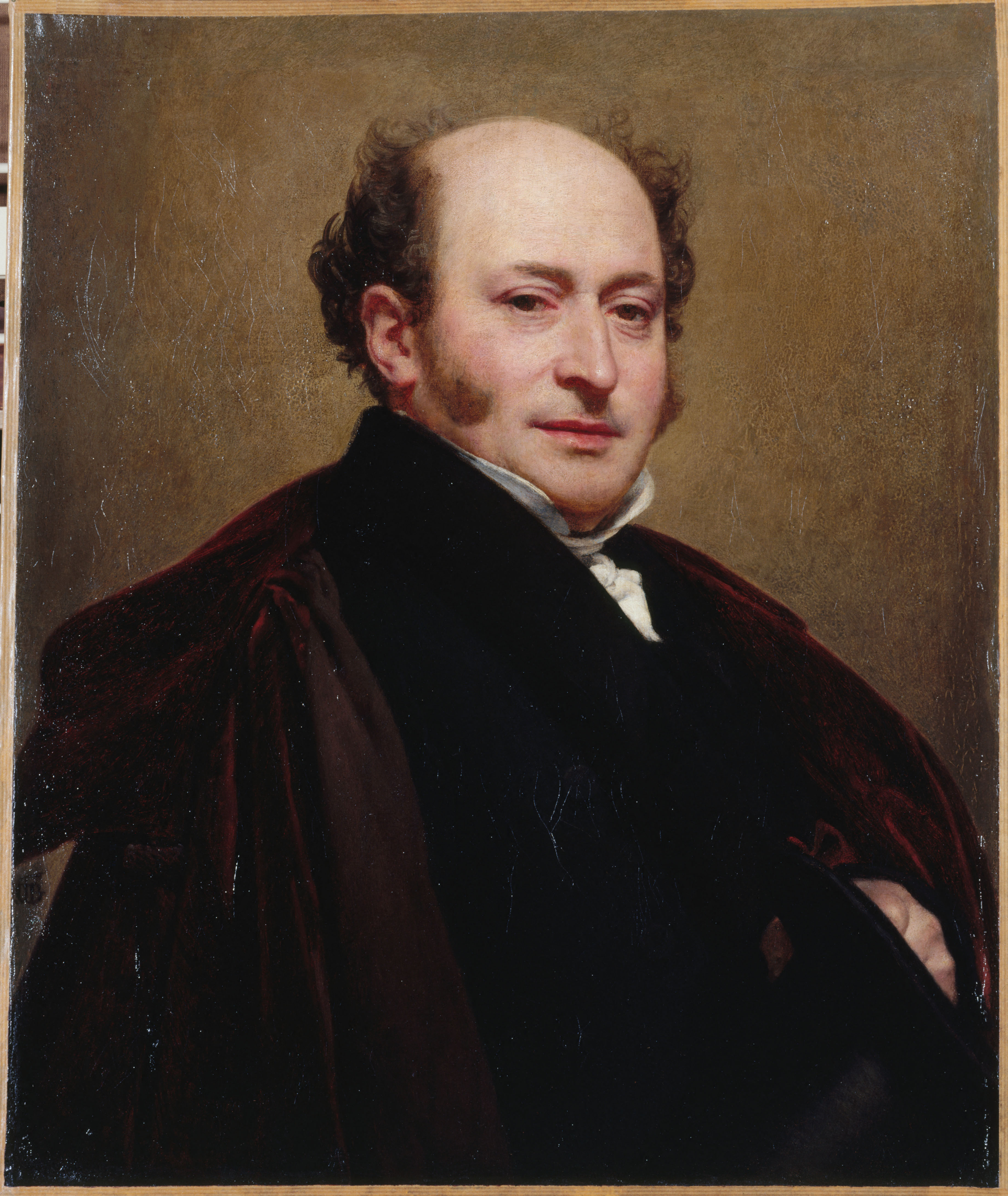
Self-portrait c. 1830

Jean-Pierre Granger (11 March 1779 – 1 December 1840) was a French painter who worked in the Neo-Classical style. He is primarily known for portraits, history paintings, and mythological scenes. He also created numerous religious works. Some sources incorrectly call him Jean-Perrin.

== Biography ==
He was born in Paris. His father was a glazier. At the age of six, he reportedly became a drum major in the "Régiment Royal-Bonbons", a children's branch of the French Guards which was intended to provide "manly, patriotic training". However, it also served as a form of amusement for the Dauphin.

Two years later, his father made the acquaintance of Angélique Briceau (fl.1780-1800), a watercolorist who gave lessons to both of them. Shortly after, she married Louis-Jean Allais, who then gave them lessons in engraving. Granger worked as an engraver for seven years but eventually felt constrained by the limits of that medium and entered the studios of Jean-Baptiste Regnault to study oil painting. Four years later, he worked closely with Jacques-Louis David.

In 1800, he was awarded the Prix de Rome for his painting Antiochus Sending His Son to Scipio as a Hostage. His colleague, Ingres, who came in second, accused David of using his influence on the jury.

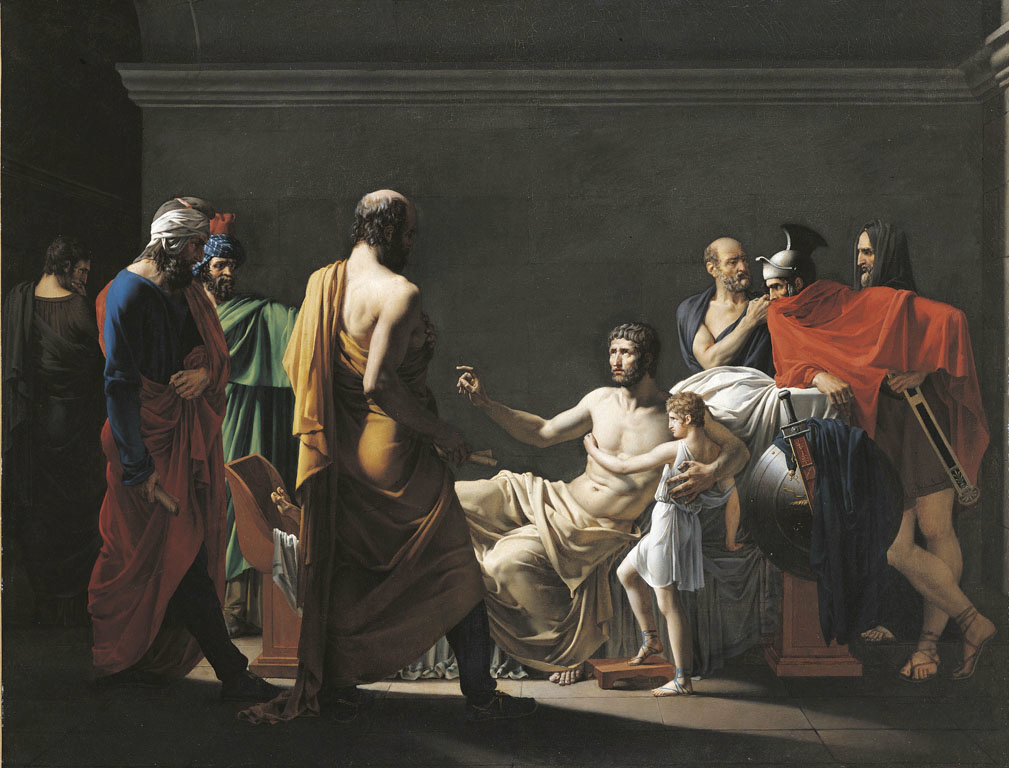
Antiochus Sending His Son to Scipio (1800)

While in Rome, he worked for Lucien Bonaparte, making sketches and paintings of the Prince's antiquities collection. He also began a portrait of Bonaparte's wife, Alexandrine de Bleschamp. However, he (and some others) found it unsatisfactory. Hence, he turned it into a painting of an anonymous lady of the court. This portrait (now in the Louvre) pleased him so much that he married the model, Jeanne-Catherine Delaigle.

He returned to Paris in 1812, and exhibited annually at the Salon until his death, receiving medals in 1812, 1817, and 1820. He died on 1 December 1840 in Paris.

His daughter, Eléonore Palmyre (1819–1874), a pianist of some note, married the writer Paul Meurice. Her portrait was painted by Ingres, who had gotten over his grudge and became her godfather. It is currently on display at the Maison de Victor Hugo.

== Selected works ==
- Antiochus Sending His Son Back to Scipio (1800), École nationale supérieure des beaux-arts, Paris.
- Apollo and Cyparissus (1816), Museum der bildenden Künste, Leipzig.
- Self-Portrait (c. 1830), Musée Carnavalet, Paris.
- Madame Granger, née Marie-Jeanne-Catherine Delaigle, portrait of the artist's wife, Louvre, Paris.
- A Nymph Teased by Loves (Une Nymphe lutinée par des amours), Musée des Beaux-Arts et d'Archéologie, Libourne, on long-term loan from the Louvre.
