= Paul Meurice =

French novelist and playwright

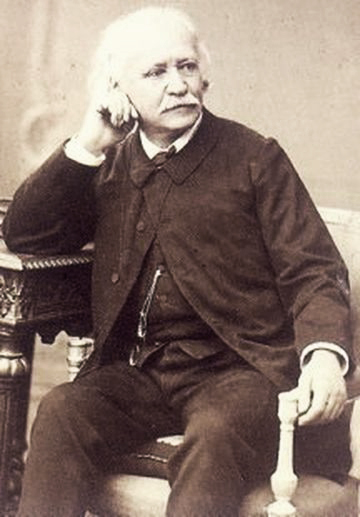
- Born: 5 February 1818; Paris, France
- Died: 11 December 1905 (aged 87); Paris, France
- Writing career
- Language: French
- Notable works: L'Événement, Le Rappel

Paul Meurice (5 February 1818 – 11 December 1905) was a French novelist and playwright best known for his friendship with Victor Hugo.

== Biography ==
Meurice was born and died in Paris. In 1836, aged eighteen, he was introduced to Hugo by his friend Auguste Vacquerie, and soon became a devoted follower. He had literary ambitions and embarked on a career as playwright.

In 1848, Hugo made him the editor-in-chief of a journal he had just founded, called L'Événement. (This resulted in Meurice's imprisonment in 1851, during Hugo's exile.) Their friendship was very deep: the poet was a witness at Meurice's marriage to Palmyre Granger, daughter of the painter Jean-Pierre Granger. During the twenty years of Hugo's exile, Meurice looked after the financial and literary interests of the proscribed writer.

He meanwhile continued his own literary career, publishing novels, some in collaboration with Alexandre Dumas, for whom he would also ghost-write. He adapted Notre-Dame de Paris, Les Misérables and Quatre-Vingt-Treize for the stage.

With Vacquerie, and Victor Hugo's son Charles, Meurice founded the journal Le Rappel in 1869. On Hugo's death in 1885, Meurice and Vacquerie were made executors of his estate. In this capacity, Meurice compiled some posthumous collections of Hugo's poems. He established the Maison de Victor Hugo in Paris in 1902.

== Works ==
- Benvenuto Cellini, play in 5 acts and 8 scenes, music by Adolphe de Groot, Paris, Théâtre de la Porte Saint-Martin, 1 April 1852
- Schamyl, play in 5 acts and 9 scenes, music by Gondois, Paris, Théâtre de la Porte Saint-Martin, 26 June 1854
- Paris, play in 5 acts, 26 scenes, prologue and epilogue, Paris, Théâtre de la Porte Saint-Martin, 21 July 1855
- L'Avocat des pauvres, play in 5 acts, Paris, Théâtre de la Gaîté (boulevard du Temple), 15 October 1856
- Fanfan la Tulipe, play in 7 acts, Paris, Théâtre de l'Ambigu-Comique, 6 November 1858
- Le Maître d'école, play in 5 acts, Paris, Théâtre de l'Ambigu-Comique, 10 March 1859
- Le Roi de Bohème et ses sept châteaux, play in 6 acts, Paris, Théâtre de l'Ambigu-comique, 22 October 1859
- François les Bas-Bleus, play in 5 acts and 7 scenes, Paris, Théâtre de l'Ambigu-Comique, 31 January 1863
- Les Deux Diane, play in 5 acts and 8 scenes, Paris, Théâtre de l'Ambigu-comique, 8 March 1865
- La Vie nouvelle, comedy in 4 acts, with prologue, Paris, Théâtre de l'Odéon, 8 April 1867
- La Brésilienne, play in 6 acts with prologue, Paris, Théâtre de l'Ambigu-Comique, 9 April 1878
- Quatre-vingt-treize, play based on the novel by Victor Hugo, by Paul Meurice, Paris, Théâtre de la Gaîté (rue Papin), 24 December 1881
- Le Songe d'une nuit d'été, fairy-tale after Shakespeare (1886)
- Struensée, drama, Paris, Comédie-Française, 5 November 1898

Plays written in collaboration

- With Auguste Vacquerie — Paroles, comedy based on Shakespeare, Paris, Second Théâtre-Français, 28 February 1843
- With Auguste Vacquerie — Antigone, tragedy after Sophocles, Paris, Second Théâtre-Français, 21 May 1844
- With Alexandre Dumas — Hamlet, prince de Danemark, play in verse in 5 acts and 8 scenes, after Shakespeare, Paris, Théâtre historique, 15 December 1847
- With George Sand — Les Beaux Messieurs de Bois-Doré, play in 5 acts, 1862
- With George Sand — Le Drac, drame fantastique in 3 acts, 1865
- With George Sand — Cadio, play in 5 acts and 8 scenes, 1868
- Revision of work by Paul Foucher — Notre-Dame de Paris, play in 5 acts and 12 scenes, based on the novel by Victor Hugo, 1886
- With Charles Hugo — Les Misérables, drama, based on the novel by Victor Hugo, Paris, Théâtre de la Porte Saint-Martin, 27 December 1899

Novels

- La Famille Aubry (3 volumes, 1854)
- Louspillac et Beautrubin (1854)
- Scènes du foyer. La Famille Aubry (1856)
- Les Tyrans de village (1857)
- Les Chevaliers de l'esprit. Césara (1869)
- Le Songe de l'amour (1889)

Novels written in collaboration

- With Alexandre Dumas — L'Orfèvre du roi, ou Ascanio (1843)

Correspondence

- Correspondance entre Victor Hugo et Paul Meurice, preface by Jules Claretie (1909)

== Bibliography ==
- Gustave Simon, « Paul Meurice. Souvenirs intimes », La Revue de Paris, mai-juin 1906, p. 61–96. Texte en ligne (in French)
