= Charcot Fan =

Deep-sea formation off Antarctica

Charcot Fan (66°0′S 86°0′W) is a deep-sea formation in the Southern Ocean. It lies off the coast of the West Antarctic Ellsworth Land.

The Charcot Fan is an abyssal fan specifically located between the Bellingshausen Plain and the continental shelf of the Bellingshausen Sea.

It is named after the French polar explorer Jean-Baptiste Charcot (1867–1936). The US Advisory Committee for Undersea Features (ACUF) confirmed the designation in June 1988.
