= Juliette Drouet =

French actress and courtesan (1806–1883)

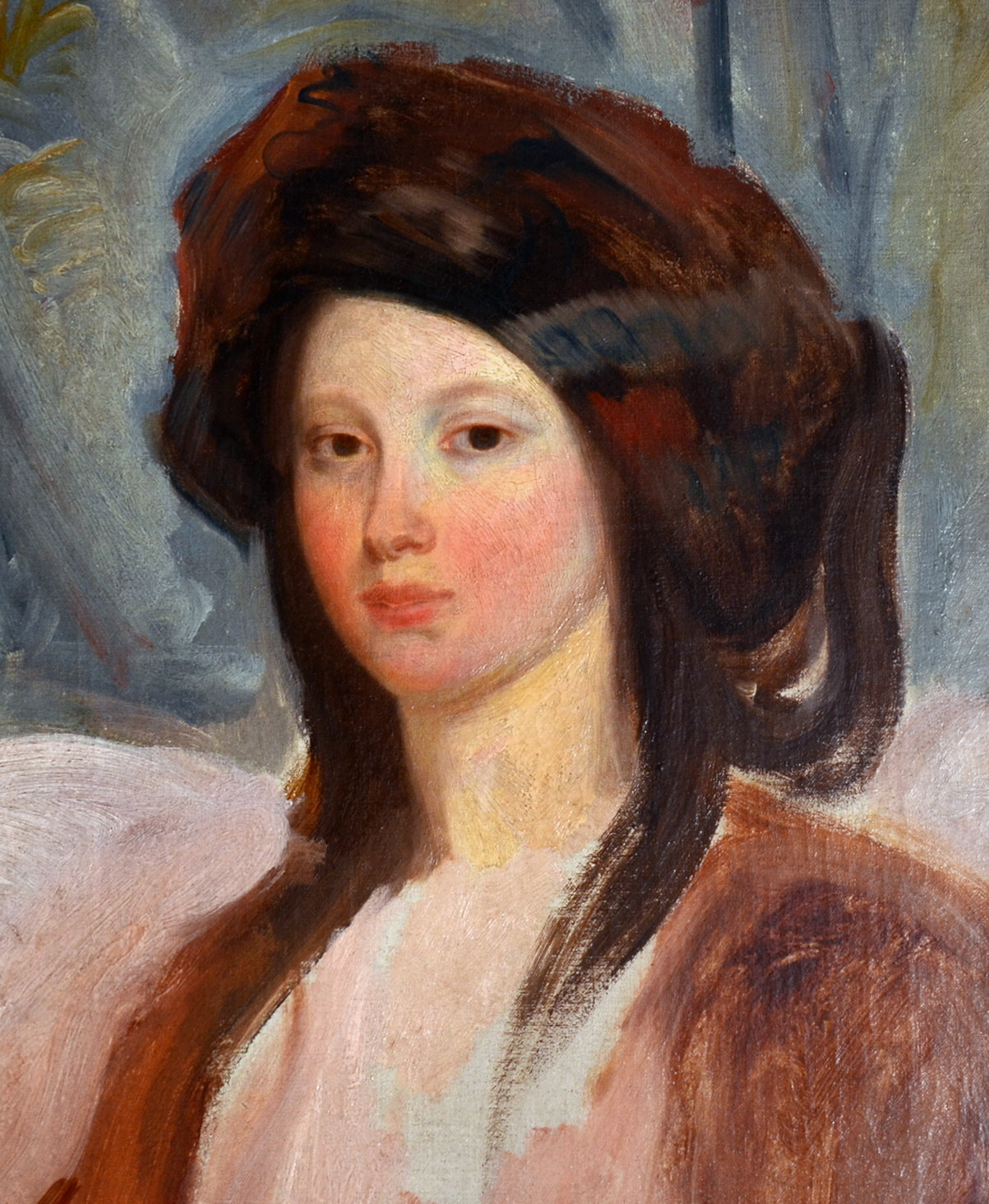
- Portrait of Juliette Drouet, by Charles-Émile-Callande de Champmartin, 1837
- Born: Julienne Joséphine Gauvain; 10 April 1806; Fougères, Brittany, France
- Died: 11 May 1883 (aged 77); Paris, France
- Occupation: Actress
- Known for: Mistress of writer Victor Hugo
- Partner(s): James Pradier; Victor Hugo
- Children: Claire Pradier

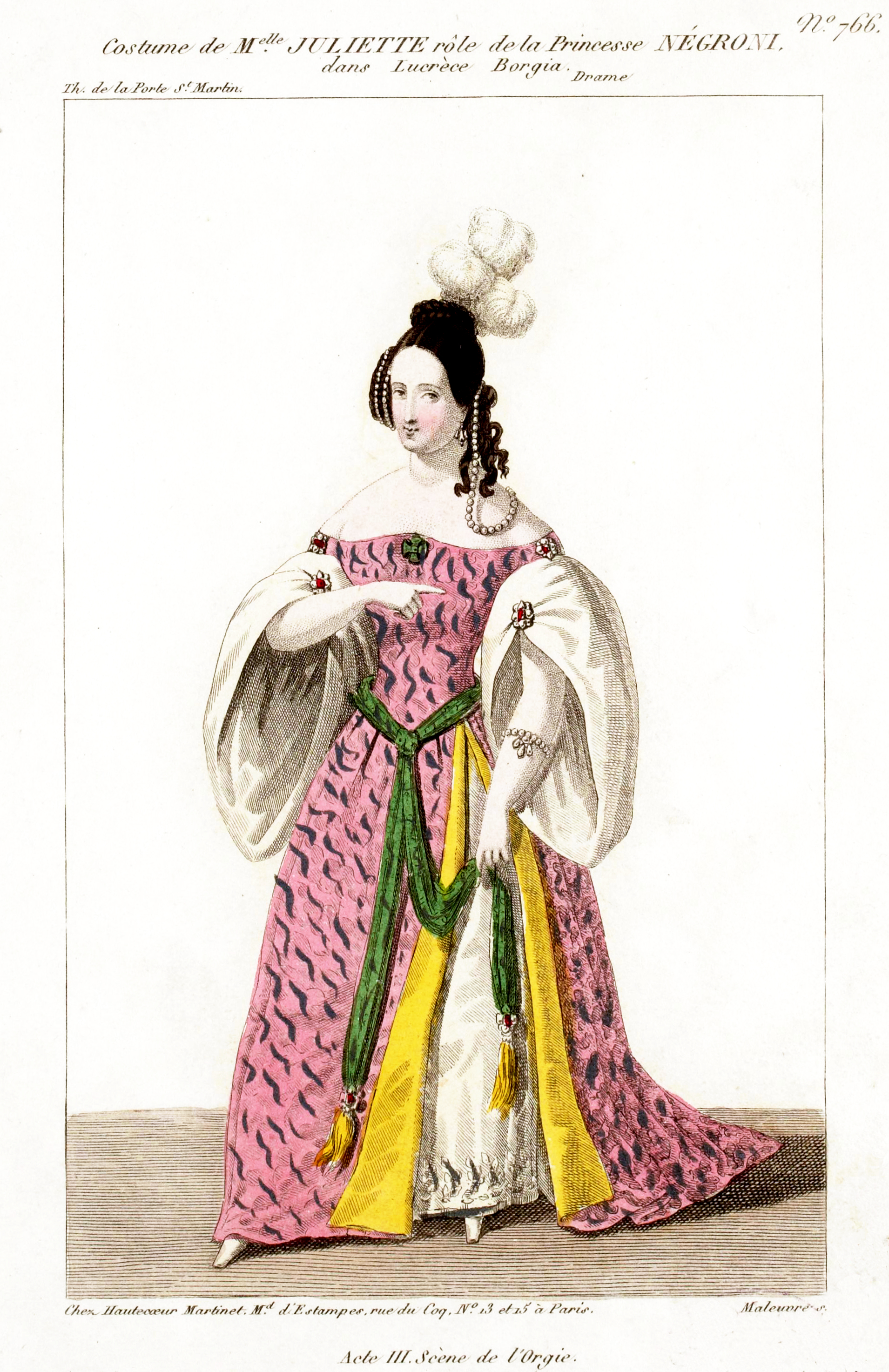
Juliette Drouet as Princess Negroni in Lucrèce Borgia

Juliette Drouet (French pronunciation: [ʒyljɛt dʁu.ɛ]; born Julienne Joséphine Gauvain [ʒyljɛn ʒozefin ɡovɛ̃]; 10 April 1806 – 11 May 1883) was a French actress. She abandoned her career on the stage after becoming the mistress of Victor Hugo, to whom she acted as a secretary and travelling companion. Juliette accompanied Hugo in his exile to the Channel Islands, and wrote thousands of letters to him throughout her life.

== Childhood and early years ==
She was born Julienne Joséphine Gauvain on 10 April 1806 in Fougères, Ille-et-Vilaine, the daughter of Julien Gauvain, a tailor, and Marie Marchandet, who was employed as a housemaid. She had two older sisters, Renee and Thérèse, and a brother Armand. Orphaned from her mother a few months after her birth, and her father the following year, Gauvain was raised by her uncle, René Drouet. She was educated in Paris at a religious boarding school and considered a precocious child, having learned to read and write at the age of five. At the age of ten, Gauvain was already proficient in literature and poetry. Around 1825, she became the mistress of sculptor James Pradier, who represented her in a statue symbolizing Strasbourg, at the Place de la Concorde in Paris. They had a daughter together, Claire. On the advice of Pradier, she started an acting career in 1829, initially in Brussels, then in Paris. It was about that time Gauvain began using her uncle's surname, Drouet.

== Life as a courtesan ==
Described by those who knew her as independent, impulsive and hot-tempered; she was also regarded by Parisian society as a typical courtesan who dressed splendidly, spent money wildly, and was extremely beautiful. Drouet had limpid, bright eyes; a fine, chiseled nose; a small, crimson mouth; set in an oval face, framed by a mass of blue-black hair.

== Victor Hugo ==
In 1833, while playing the role of Princess Négroni in the stage production Lucrezia Borgia she met Victor Hugo, whose wife Adèle was having an affair with the critic Sainte-Beuve. Her last stage role was of Lady Jane Grey in Hugo's Marie Tudor in 1833, after which she abandoned her theatrical career and dedicated the remainder of her life to her lover. She became Hugo's secretary and traveling companion. For many years she lived a cloistered life, leaving home only in his company. In 1852, she accompanied him in his exile on Jersey, and then in 1855 on Guernsey. She wrote thousands of letters to him throughout her life, which testify to her writing talent according to Henri Troyat who wrote her biography in 1997. Each year, from 16 February 1834 to 1883, they celebrated the anniversary of the first night they had spent together. Victor Hugo even slipped this personal anecdote into the plot of Les Misérables: Marius Pontmercy and Cosette’s wedding night takes place on the same date.

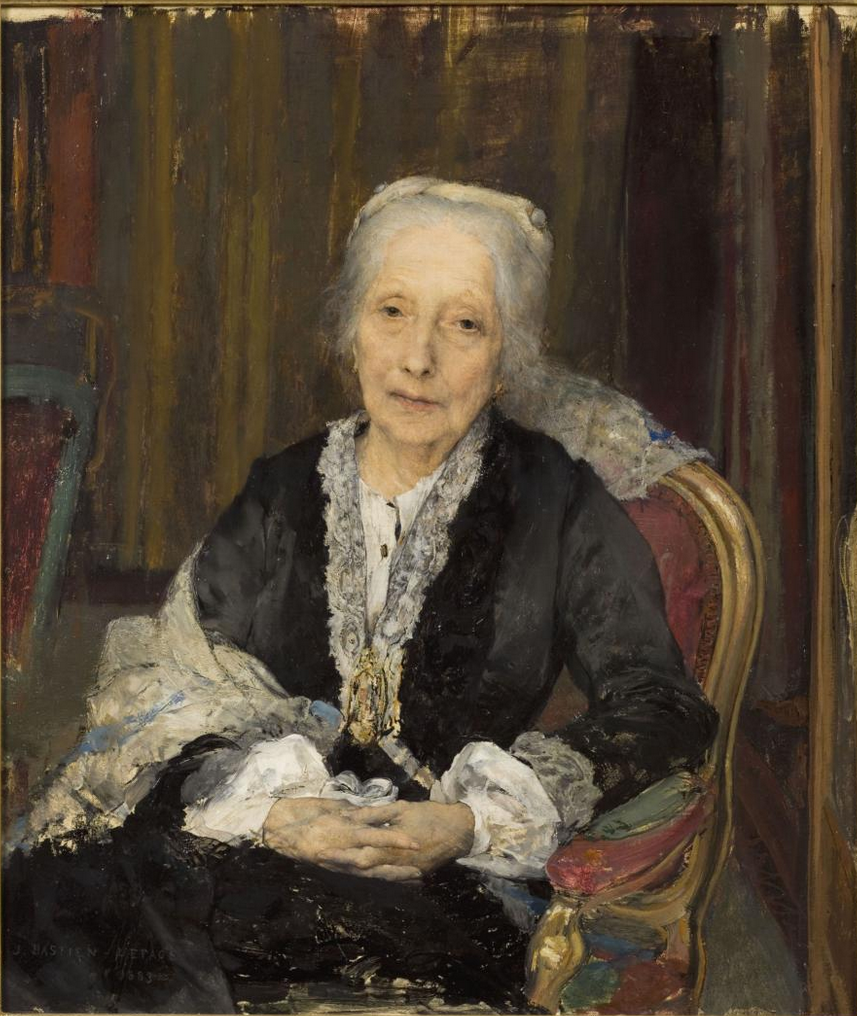
Portrait by Jules Bastien-Lepage, 1883

Juliette Drouet died in Paris on 11 May 1883 at the age of 77. Hugo’s family dissuaded him from attending Juliette’s funeral out of concern for what people might say.

== Bibliography ==
- Simone de Beauvoir, Patrick O'Brian (Translator). The Coming of Age. W. W. Norton & Company. ISBN 0-393-31443-X
- Juliette Drouet, Evelyn Blewer (Editor), Victoria Tietze Larson (Translator). My Beloved Toto: Letters from Juliette Drouet to Victor Hugo 1833-1882. State University of New York Press (June 2006) ISBN 0-7914-6572-1
- Graham Robb, 1999. Victor Hugo: A Biography. W. W. Norton & Company. ISBN 0-393-31899-0
- Henri Troyat, 1997. Juliette Drouet: La prisonnière sur parole. Flammarion. ISBN 2-08-067403-X
