= Charles Hugo (writer) =

French journalist, photographer (1826–1871)

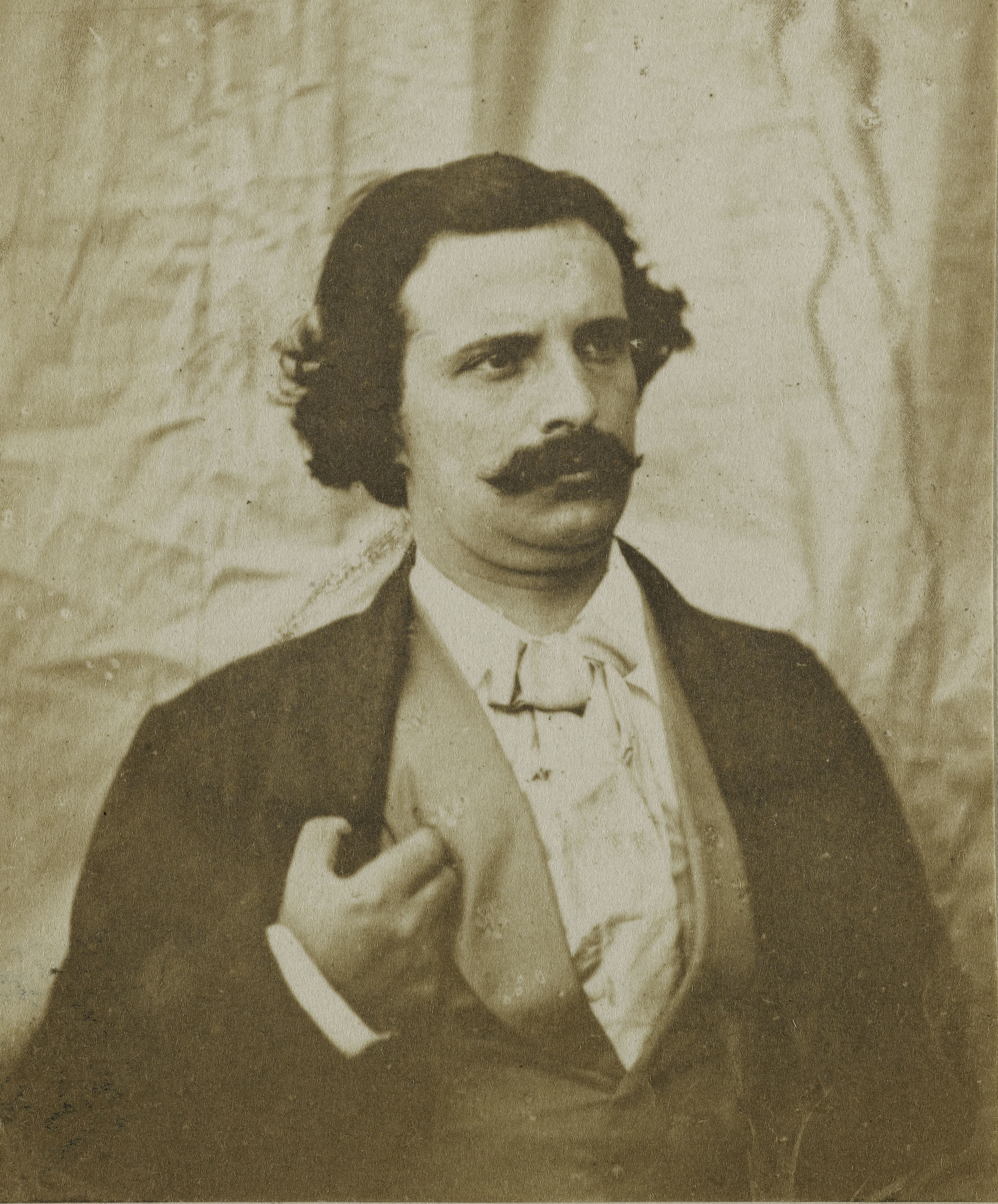
- Hugo c. 1854
- Born: 3 November 1826; Paris, France
- Died: 13 March 1871 (aged 44); Bordeaux, France
- Resting place: Pere Lachaise
- Occupations: journalist; photographer
- Spouse: Alice Lehaene
- Children: Jeanne Hugo
- Relatives: Victor Hugo; Adèle Foucher
- Writing career
- Pen name: Charles d'Auverney; Paul de la Miltière
- Language: French
- Notable work: Founder of Le Rappel

Charles-Victor Hugo (French pronunciation: [ʃaʁl viktɔʁ yɡo]; 4 November 1826 – 13 March 1871) was a French journalist and photographer. He was the second son of French novelist Victor Hugo and his wife Adèle Foucher.

== Life and work ==
In 1851, Charles-Victor was sentenced to six months in jail and a fine of five hundred francs for an article opposing capital punishment that he wrote for the French daily newspaper L'Evénement. His father, Victor Hugo, delivered a notable speech in his defence on 10 June 1851.

When Napoleon III came to power in 1851, Charles-Victor joined his father in voluntary exile on the island of Jersey. Together with August Vacquerie, he photographed family and friends with the aim of publishing a volume titled Jersey et les îles de la Manche. The intended work was to feature poetry and drawings by his father, Victor-Marie, and prose by Vacquerie, Charles-Victor, and his brother, François. However, the publication never occurred. Instead, the photographs were compiled into private albums and shared with friends.

In 1868, he and his brother François-Victor founded the French daily newspaper Le Rappel.

In 1871, Charles-Victor died from a stroke while en route to meet his father for dinner.

Appalling misfortune. Charles died this evening, 13th. Sudden stroke of apoplexy

— Victor Hugo, Choses vues, 13 March 1871

Photography by Charles Hugo
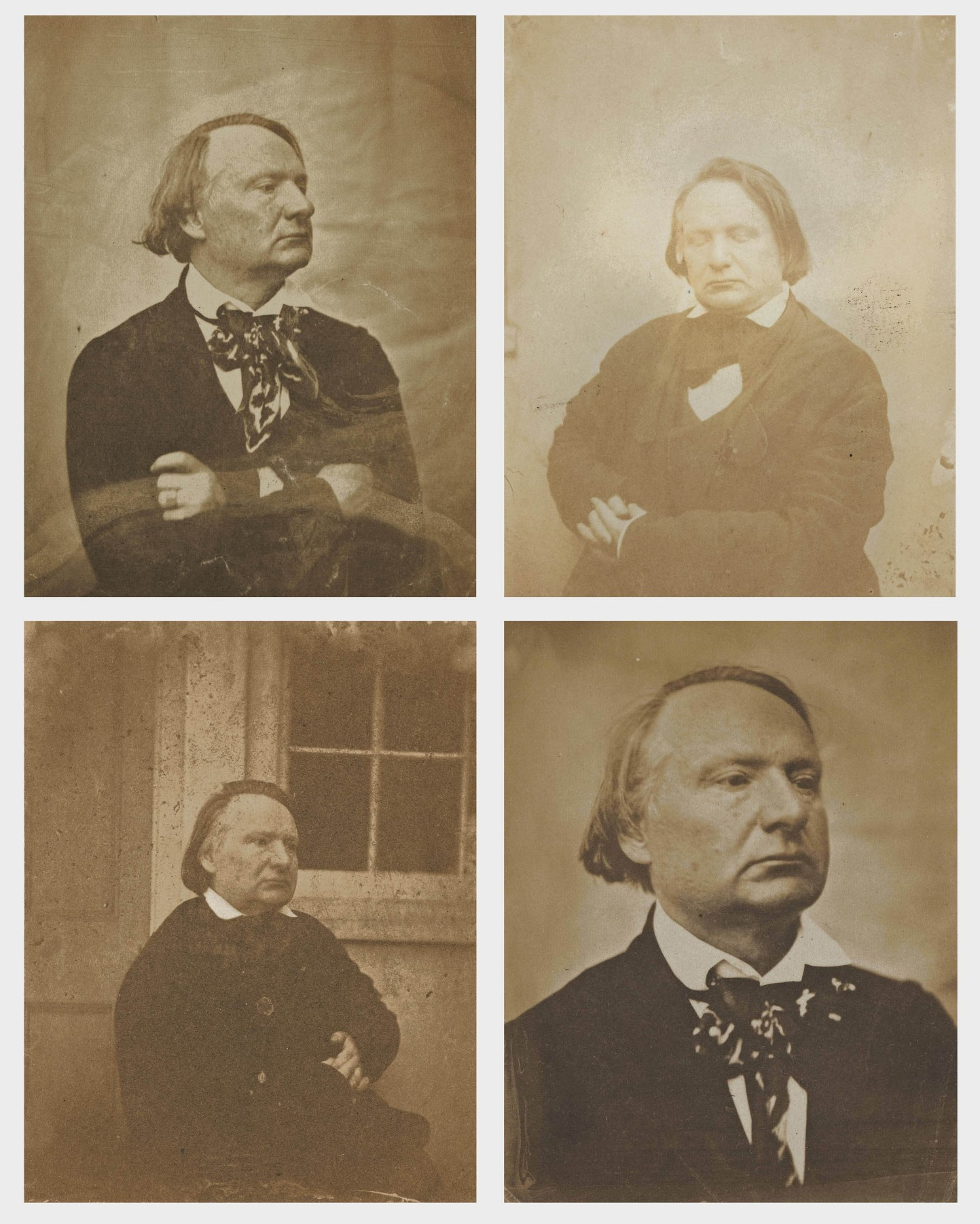
Victor Hugo c.1854

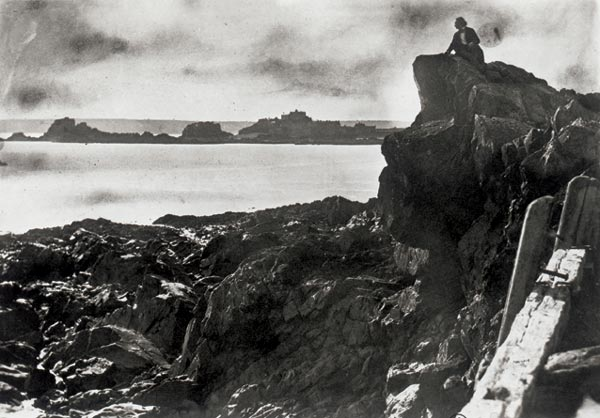
Victor Hugo in Jersey c.1852

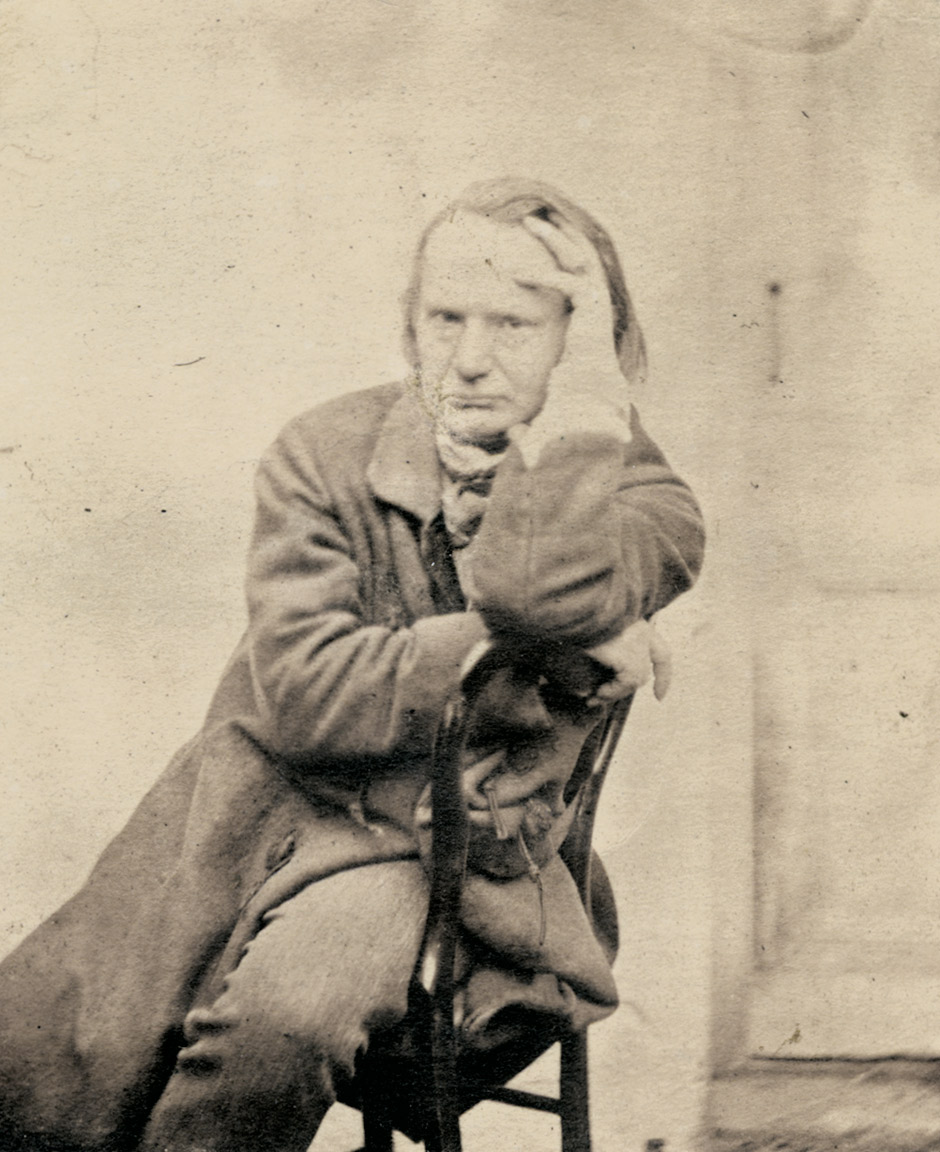
Victor Hugo c.1853
