= Hugo Island =

Island in Graham Land, Antarctica

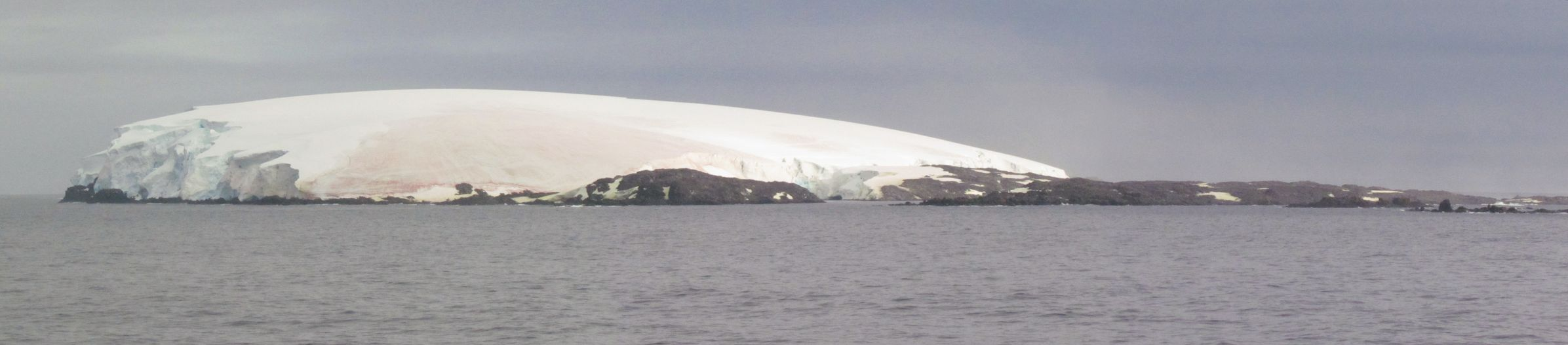
- Hugo Island, 2011

- Location within Antarctica

Geography
- Location: Antarctica
- Coordinates: 64°57′S 65°45′W
- Width: 6.28 km (3.902 mi)

Administration
- Administered under the Antarctic Treaty System

Demographics
- Population: Uninhabited

Hugo Island (or Víctor Hugo) is an isolated ice-covered island 2 kilometres (1 nmi) long, with several rocky islets and pinnacles off its east side, located off the west side of the Antarctic Peninsula, about 74 kilometres (40 nmi) southwest of Cape Monaco, Anvers Island. It was probably discovered by C.J. Evensen, captain of the Peninsula in 1893, because an unnamed island of similar extent and location first appeared on the charts at that time. The island was charted by the French Antarctic Expedition, 1903–05, under Dr. J.B. Charcot, who named it for the French poet and novelist Victor Hugo, grandfather of Charcot's first wife, whose maiden name was Jeanne Hugo.

== See also ==
- List of Antarctic and sub-Antarctic islands
- Phelps Rock
