= Phelps Rock =

Rock in Wilhelm Archipelago, Antarctica

Coordinates: 65°0′S 65°50′W

Phelps Rock is an insular rock rising 10 m above sea level southwest of Hugo Island, in the west approaches to French Passage, Wilhelm Archipelago. The rock was charted by a Royal Navy Hydrographic Survey Unit from HMS Protector, 1966–67. Named by United Kingdom Antarctic Place-Names Committee (UK-APC) after Captain Edmund M.S. Phelps, First Officer in John Biscoe, 1966-72 (Senior Master from 1972), who assisted with the hydrographic survey of the area, 1965–67.
