= L'Art d'être grand-père =

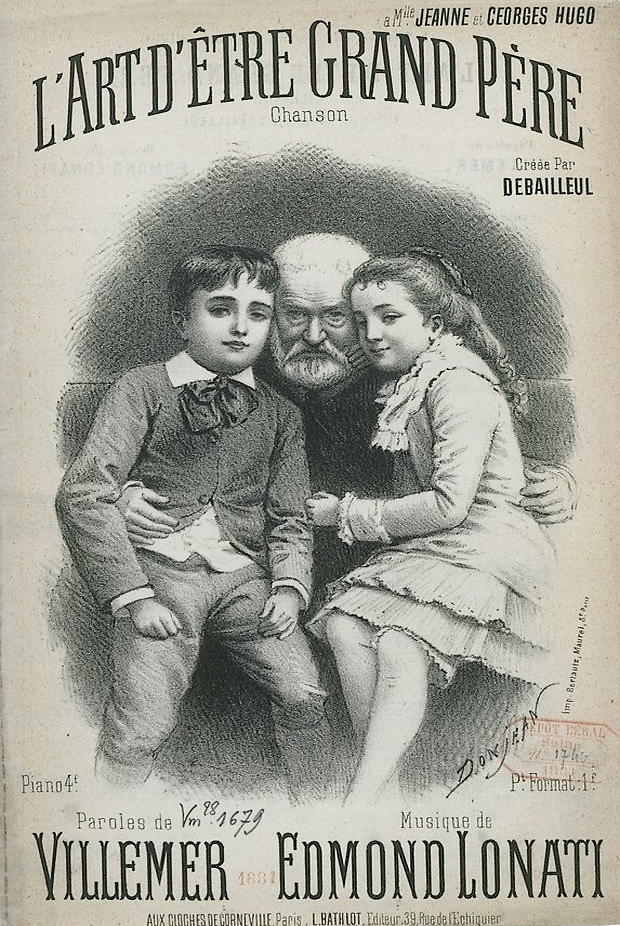
A cover for the 1881 score of L'Art d'être Grand-Père, engraved by Gustave Donjean based on a photo by Achille Mélandri.

L'Art d'être grand-père ("The Art of Being a Grandfather") is a substantial book of poems by Victor Hugo, published in 1877. They were among the last he wrote.

On 13 March 1871, Hugo's 44-year-old son Charles died of a stroke while riding in a carriage to a farewell dinner for some of Victor's friends at a restaurant in Bordeaux. Charles's wife died shortly afterwards, and Victor Hugo became the guardian of their children, Georges and Jeanne Hugo. The poems describe the feelings of a grandfather entrusted with innocent young children. Love and tenderness are celebrated, discipline is discounted; the freshness and laughter of the young soften the potential bleakness of old age. A trip to the zoo sets the poet musing. Many charming scenes are depicted. He keeps up his attack on tyranny and bigotry, and his search for truth.

The English version by Timothy Adès is How to be a Grandfather, Hearing Eye, London 2002.
