= François-Victor Hugo =

French literary translator (1828-1873)

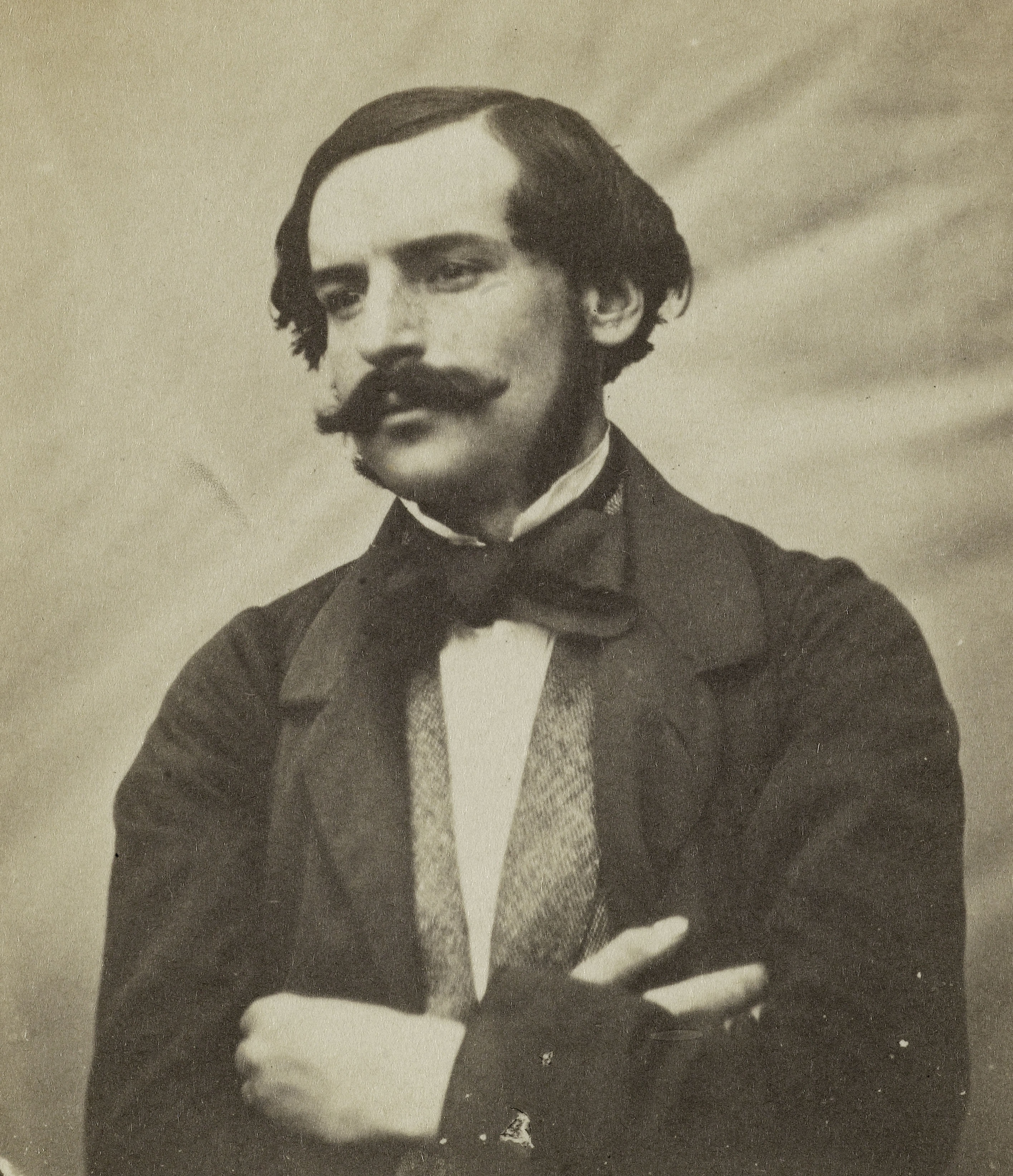
- Born: 28 October 1828; Paris, Kingdom of France
- Died: 26 December 1873 (aged 45)
- Occupations: writer, translator
- Parent(s): Victor Hugo; Adèle Foucher
- Writing career
- Notable work: translations of the works of William Shakespeare into French language

François-Victor Hugo (French pronunciation: [fʁɑ̃swa viktɔʁ yɡo]; 28 October 1828 – 26 December 1873) was a French writer and translator. He was the fourth of five children of French novelist Victor Hugo and his wife Adèle Foucher. François-Victor is best known for his translations of the works of William Shakespeare into French, which were published in 18 volumes between 1859 and 1866.

François-Victor was politically active, helping his father publish two newspapers—"The Event" (L'Événement, 1848–1851) and "The Reminder" (Le Rappel, 1869)—both of which were shut down for political reasons. He followed his father into exile on Guernsey in 1852; while there, he assisted his elder brother Charles, a pioneering photographer, in creating portraits of the Hugo family and others. François-Victor also published a book, "The Unknown Normandy" (La Normandie inconnue), in 1857.

The Hugo family returned from exile in 1870, after the declaration of the French Third Republic, but François-Victor died only a few years later, from tuberculosis, aged 45. Because of Victor Hugo's antipathy to the Catholic Church, he insisted that his son be buried without a crucifix or the assistance of a priest.
