= Lumière Peak =

Mountain in Antarctica

- Location within Antarctica

Highest point
- Coordinates: 65.3°S 64°W

Naming
- Etymology: Named after Louis Lumière

Geography
- Location: Graham Land, Antarctica

Lumière Peak (65°18′S 64°3′W) is a peak, 1,065 metres (3,500 ft) high, standing 3 nautical miles (6 km) southeast of Cape Tuxen on the west coast of Graham Land, Antarctica. It was discovered by the Third French Antarctic Expedition, 1903–05, and named by Jean-Baptiste Charcot for Louis Lumière, a leader in photographic research and development in France at that time.
