= Charcotiana =

Scientific classification
- Domain: Eukaryota
- Kingdom: Fungi
- Division: Ascomycota
- Class: Lecanoromycetes
- Order: Teloschistales
- Family: Teloschistaceae
- Genus: Charcotiana; Søchting, Garrido-Ben. & Arup (2014)
- Species: C. antarctica

Binomial name
- Charcotiana antarctica Søchting, Garrido-Ben., Pérez-Ort., Seppelt & Castello (2014)

Single-species fungal genus

Charcotiana is a single-species genus in the family Teloschistaceae. It contains the species Charcotiana antarctica, a crustose lichen found in Antarctica.

== Taxonomy ==
Both the genus Charcotiana and its sole species Charcotiana antarctica were described in 2014 in a study conducted by a team of lichenologists. The name of the genus is a tribute to the renowned French polar explorer and scientist, Jean-Baptiste Charcot (1867–1936). The species was named to reflect its distribution, which is limited to continental Antarctica and nearby islands. The type specimen was collected from Cape Phillips, Daniell Peninsula, Northern Victoria Land, where it was found growing on volcanic rock. Charcotiana is in the subfamily Xanthorioideae of the family Teloschistaceae.

== Description ==
The thallus of Charcotiana antarctica is crustose, orange, and varies from bullate to areolate with minutely lobate margins. It is often distinctly stipitate, especially when fertile. The apothecia are crowded, frequently stipitate, and irregular, with an excluded margin. The species is characterized by polaridiblastic spores measuring approximately 12.0 by 6.5 μm with a septum of about 3.5 μm.

The areoles of the lichen are small, initially isolated and bullate, eventually coalescing into larger, irregular-shaped areoles with minutely lobate margins. The thallus colour ranges from pale to deep orange. The apothecia are lecanorine to mostly zeorine, with one per areole, numerous, and rather crowded. The discs are deep orange to dark orange-brown in mature apothecia. Both the thallus and apothecia have a K+ (purple) chemical spot test reaction. Charcotiana antarctica contain lichen products in the so-called chemosyndrome A, previously identified by Søchting, indicating the presence of parietin as the major substance, and smaller proportions of emodin, fallacinal, parietinic acid, and teloschistin.

== Habitat, distribution, and ecology ==
Charcotiana antarctica grows in a variety of microhabitats, including large stones, scoria debris, pebbles, rubble, gravel, silt, vulcanites, charnockite, and coarse-grained granite. It is commonly found in small rock crevices, where it can retain a more humid environment. The species is known from coastal sites and high mountain ranges in Antarctica, typically found at altitudes ranging from 215 to 652 m (705 to 2,139 ft) above sea level. It is considered a common but often overlooked species in continental Antarctica.

Charcotiana antarctica demonstrates adaptability to its environment, growing on acidic rocks, sand, and dead mosses. Specimens growing on sandy soil and mosses develop a continuous, granular thallus, with areoles that can be somewhat more greenish yellow when in the shade. Charcotiana antarctica is commonly found in the company of several other species, including the lichens Buellia frigida, Lecanora mons-nivis, Lecanora physciella, Lecidea cancriformis, Pleopsidium chlorophanum, Umbilicaria decussata, and Rusavskia elegans. Additionally, it is often observed in association with the moss Syntrichia sarconeurum.
