= Adèle Hugo =

Youngest child of Victor Hugo (1830–1915)

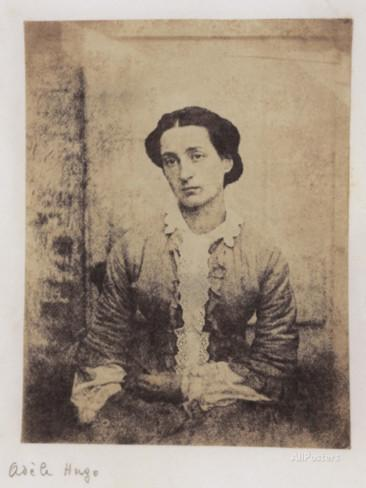
- Born: 24 August 1830; Paris, Kingdom of France
- Died: 21 April 1915 (aged 84); Suresnes, France
- Parent(s): Victor Hugo; Adèle Foucher

Adèle Hugo (French pronunciation: [adɛl yɡo]; 24 August 1830 – 21 April 1915) was the fifth and youngest child of French writer Victor Hugo. She is remembered for developing schizophrenia as a young woman, which led to a romantic obsession with a British military officer who rejected her. Her story has been retold in film and books, such as François Truffaut's 1975 film The Story of Adèle H.

== Childhood ==
Adèle Hugo was raised in a cultured, affluent home in Paris, the youngest child of Adèle (née Foucher) and Victor Hugo, France's most famous writer. Adèle enjoyed playing the piano, and she was known for her beauty and long dark hair. She sat for portraits by several well-known Parisian artists. In 1852, the Hugo family moved to the island of Guernsey after Victor Hugo was forced into political exile. The Hugos remained on the Channel Islands until 1870. In Guernsey, Adèle met Albert Pinson, the object of her obsession.

== Illness and pursuit of Albert Pinson ==
Signs of mental illness became apparent in Adèle in 1856. She had several offers of marriage and romantic infatuations by the time she met and became romantically involved with British army officer Albert Andrew ("Bertie") Pinson in 1854. She was almost 24, and he was approximately two years her junior. He proposed marriage to Adèle in 1855, but she rejected him. Adèle later had a change of heart, wanting to reconcile with Pinson, but he refused to be involved with her. Pinson continued his military career, being sent to the 16th Regiment of Foot in Bedfordshire in 1856, where he seldom saw Adèle. Pinson then went to Ireland in 1858, upon promotion to lieutenant, where he was stationed until 1861.

Despite Pinson's rejection, she continued pursuing him. Pinson developed a reputation for living a "life of debauchery." Adèle followed him when he was stationed to Halifax, Nova Scotia in 1863. Adèle's family worried for her well-being and tried to track her whereabouts by letters:

Contemporary reports, given by those who may have had some contact with Adèle or who knew her personally, came from her lawyers Mr. Motton and Mr. Lenoir, her neighbors, the local sheriff, and the owner of a bookstore from whom she purchased writing supplies (Guille 132). It is from the document provided by the families with whom Adèle lived, the Saunders and the Mottons, that we have the greatest detail concerning her life during this three-year period. Mrs. Saunders' faithful correspondence with François-Victor in particular, permitted the Hugo family to be kept abreast of Adèle's health, activities and visitors. Their correspondence spans not only the time during which Adèle was a lodger in the Saunders' home, but the time leading up to her departure from Halifax in December of 1866 when she resided with the Motton family two miles outside of town (Guille 100).

In 1866, Pinson was stationed to Barbados, the British colonial centre in the Caribbean region; Adèle again followed him. In 1869, Pinson permanently separated from Adèle when he left Barbados as the 16th was sent to Dublin. There he met and married Catherine Edith Roxburgh in 1870, a well-off daughter of British Lieutenant-Colonel James Roxburgh.

Adèle did not return to France until 1872 at the age of 41. In the interim, the Hugo family was unable to track her activities.

An account of Adèle's wretched situation in Barbados was given by Cathonoy, the head of the Catholic mission in Trinidad, in a letter dated 8 September 1885. He relates an incident where he met a Barbadian woman of African descent, named Madame Céline Alvarez Baa, who requested that a mass be said for Victor Hugo after news of the author's death. Curious to know the reason for Madame Baa's interest in Victor Hugo, Cathonoy asked questions, and he learned that Madame Baa had given Adèle shelter when she was abandoned on Barbados, where she was known as Madame Pinson. Adèle had been found wandering the streets, talking to herself, detached from her surroundings. Madame Baa had taken Adèle to her family in Paris; Adèle was left in medical care, and a grateful Victor Hugo had reimbursed Madame Baa for her expenses. An account similar to Cathonoy's was given in an anonymous letter to the editor published by the New-York Tribune on 27 May 1885.

Much of what is known about Adèle's life and her pursuit of Pinson comes from her diaries and letters. Adèle kept a journal while she lived on Jersey and Guernsey, which she titled Journal de l'Exil (Diary of the Exile). She stopped keeping a diary by the time she landed in Barbados due to her mental deterioration.

== Mental condition and later life ==
Adèle's obsession was a manifestation of erotomania. Along with her other symptoms of mental illness, including hallucinations, Adèle's condition indicates schizophrenia. The illness appeared in other members of the Hugo family; Victor Hugo's brother Eugène also had schizophrenia.

Adèle was ultimately sent to live in a mental institution for the affluent outside Paris. She remained there until her death in 1915. The widowed Pinson died the same year, five months after Adele. Out of Victor Hugo's five children, Adèle was the only one who outlived him. She is buried in Villequier Churchyard, Villequier, France.

== In media ==
Adèle's obsession with Pinson inspired the 1975 biographical film The Story of Adèle H., directed by François Truffaut and starring Isabelle Adjani. Several biographies have been published about Adèle Hugo. Also her life and obsession with Pinson was put in a book titled Adèle Hugo: La Misérable by Leslie Smith Dow.

== In Pursuit of Love. The Search for Victor Hugo's Daughter by Mark Bostridge ==
Mark Bostridge's book, published by Bloomsbury in 2024, explores his own obsession with Adèle Hugo in a biography-cum-memoir, described by the London Sunday Times as "gloriously rich and capacious". In the course of his search, Bostridge uncovered new information about Albert Pinson, tracking down Pinson's descendants and finding a photo of him, as well as letters and other documents.

== See also ==
- Camille Claudel
