= Jean-Baptiste Charcot =

French polar explorer, scientist, Olympic sailer and medical doctor (1867–1936)

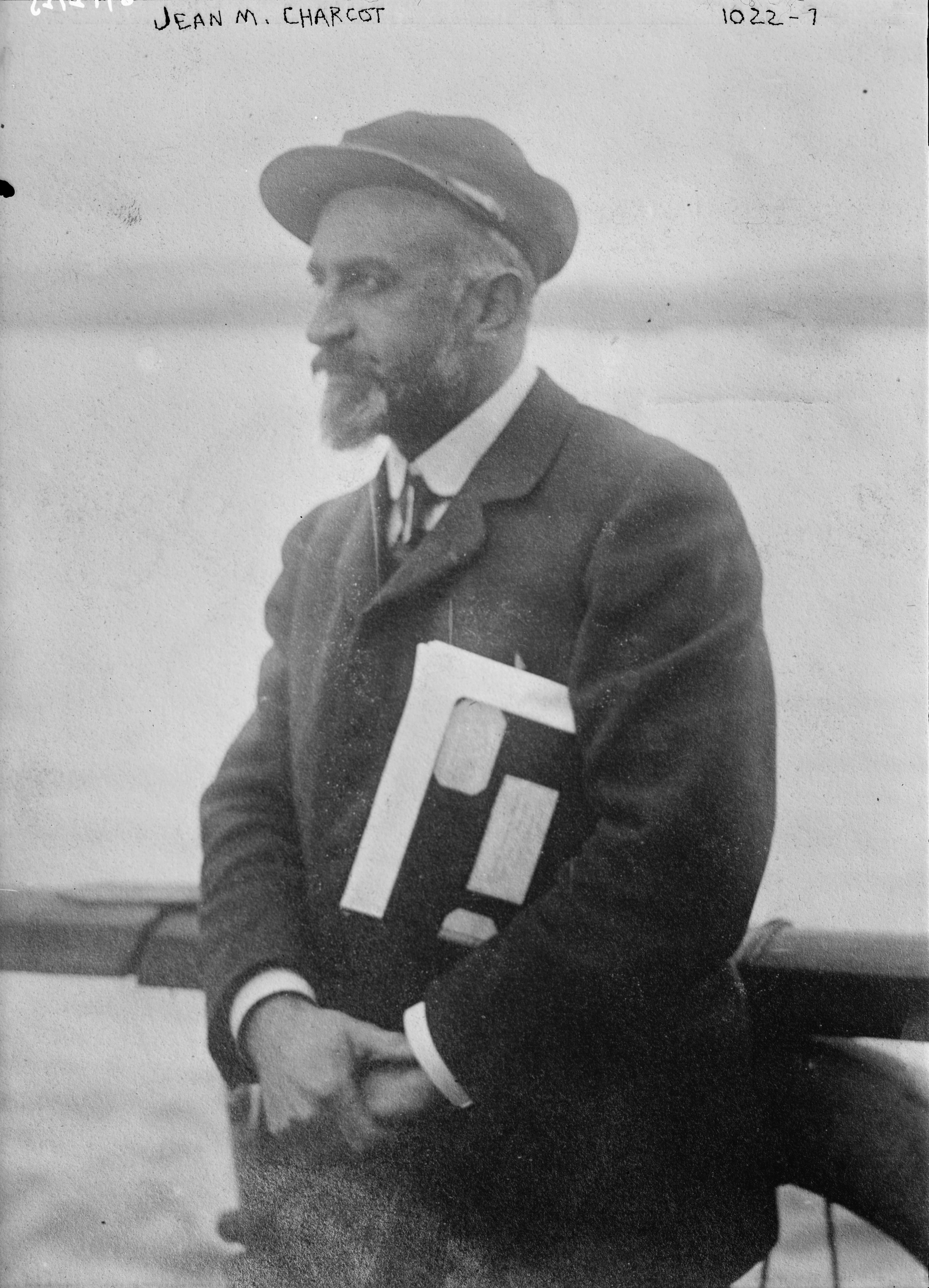
- Charcot in 1925
- Born: Jean-Baptiste Auguste Étienne Charcot; 15 July 1867; Neuilly-sur-Seine, France
- Died: 16 September 1936 (aged 69); At sea, 30 miles northwest of Reykjavík, Iceland
- Occupations: Polar explorer, medical doctor, Olympian, scientist
- Known for: his polar explorations
- Spouse(s): Jeanne Hugo (m. 1896; div. 1905) Meg Cléry (m. 1907)
- Sports career
- Sport: Sailing
- Classes: 0 to 0.5 ton Open class
Medal record
Sailing
Representing France
Olympic Games
| Silver medal – second place | 1900 Paris | Ton class 1st race |
| Silver medal – second place | 1900 Paris | Ton class 2nd race |
- Updated on 2014-02-08

Jean-Baptiste Étienne Auguste Charcot (French pronunciation: [ʒɑ̃batist ʃaʁko]; 15 July 1867 – 16 September 1936), better known in France as Commandant Charcot (Commander Charcot), was a French scientist, medical doctor and polar scientist. His father was the neurologist Jean-Martin Charcot (1825–1893). As a sportsman, he was French rugby XV champion in 1896 and also won a double silver medal in sailing at the 1900 Summer Olympics.

== Life ==
Dr Jean-Baptiste Charcot wearing wool polar clothing tailored by Ström Paris for the expedition of Le Français (Les Armes et les Sports, 1903).

Jean-Baptiste Charcot was appointed leader of the French Antarctic Expedition with the ship Français exploring the west coast of Graham Land from 1904 until 1907. To withstand the extreme cold, Charcot opted for woolen cold-weather garments instead of traditional furs, commissioning his polar wardrobe and the crew's outfits from Parisian tailor Ström. The expedition reached Adelaide Island in 1905 and took pictures of the Palmer Archipelago and Loubet Coast. From 1908 until 1910, another expedition followed with the ship Pourquoi Pas ?, exploring the Bellingshausen Sea and the Amundsen Sea and discovering Loubet Land, Marguerite Bay, Mount Boland and Charcot Island, which was named after his father, Jean-Martin Charcot. He named Hugo Island after Victor Hugo, the grandfather of his wife, Jeanne Hugo.

The Royal Geographical Society awarded its Patron's Medal to Charcot in 1911, citing "his important expeditions to the Antarctic, during which he conducted investigations of high scientific value in geology, meteorology, magnetic conditions and biology."

Later on, Jean-Baptiste Charcot explored Rockall in 1921 and Eastern Greenland and Svalbard from 1925 until 1936. He died when Pourquoi-Pas ? was wrecked in a storm off the coast of Iceland in 1936.

Charcot participated in many sports. He won two silver medals in sailing at the Summer Olympics of 1900.

== Dedications ==
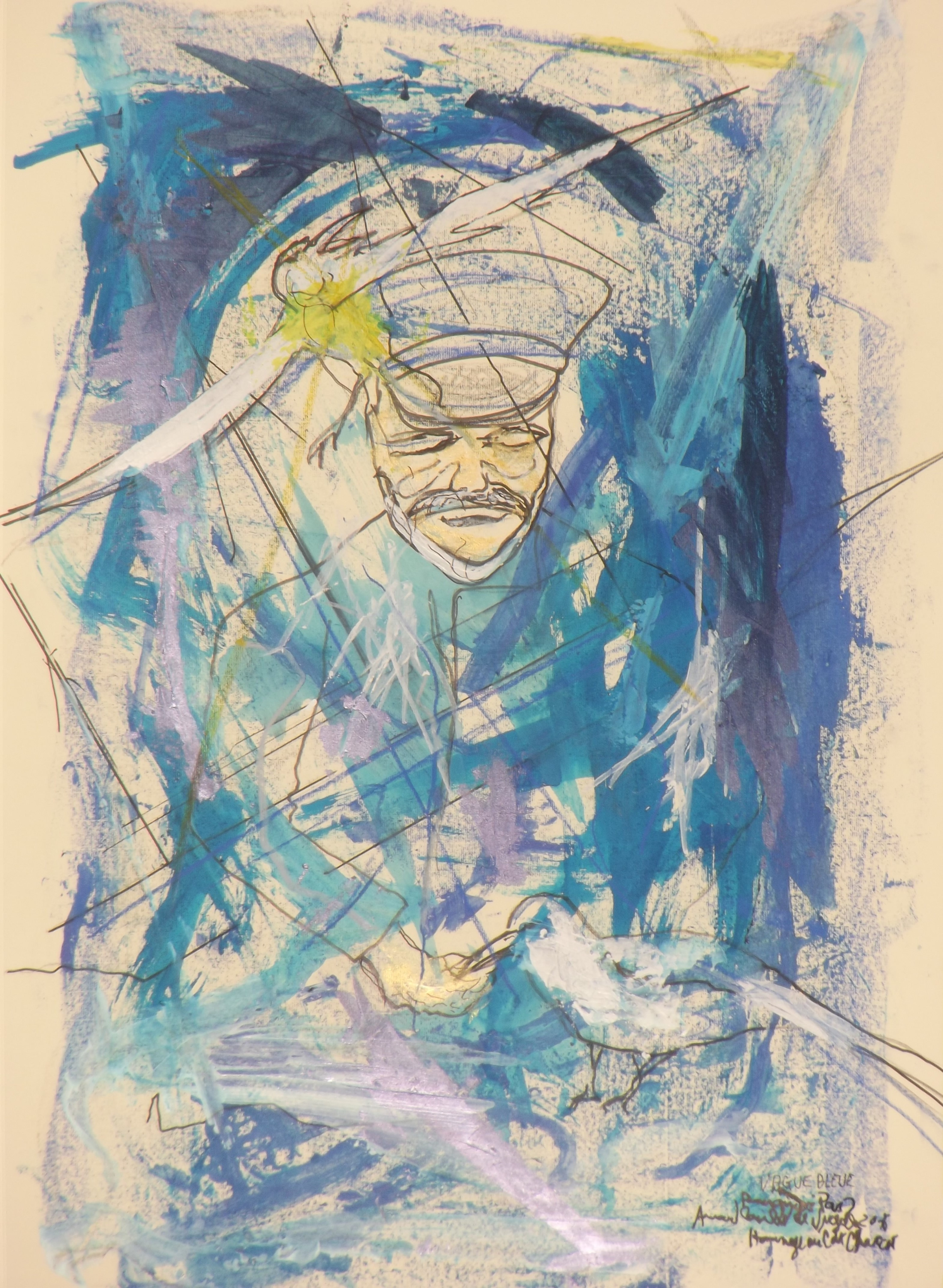
Vague Bleue ou Pourquoi pas. Hommage au commandant Charcot, by the French painter Arnaud Courlet de Vregille, 2016 (80 x 120 cm, Acrylic and pencil).

A monument to Charcot was created in Reykjavík, Iceland by sculptor Einar Jónsson in 1936 and another by Ríkarður Jónsson in 1952.

Charcot has had various places and things named after him:

- Charcotiana, a lichen genus
- Charcot Bay, Antarctica
- Charcot Fan, an abyssal fan in the Southern Ocean
- Charcot Land, a peninsula in Greenland
- Le Commandant Charcot, an icebreaking cruise ship

== See also ==
- A Clinical Lesson at the Salpêtrière – 1887 group tableau portrait by André Brouillet
- Marthe Emmanuel – biographer of Charcot
