= Henry Maret =

French journalist and politician (1837–1917)

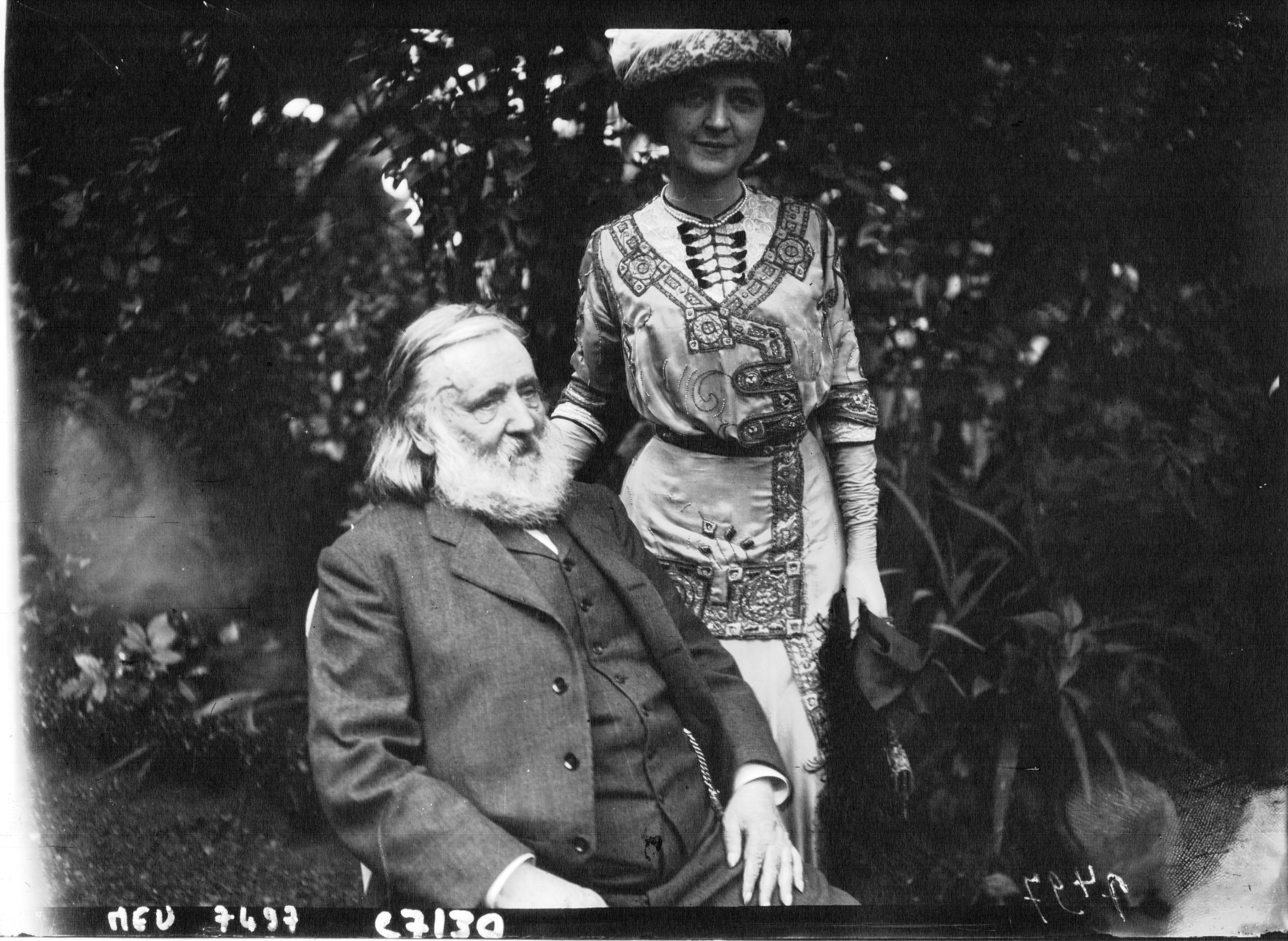
Henri Maret with the actress Marcelle Géniat

Henry Maret (4 March 1837 – 5 January 1917) was a French journalist and politician.

Maret was born in Sancerre. He belonged to the Radical Party. He was a member of the Chamber of Deputies from 1881 to 1906. He died in Paris, aged 79.
