= Hauteville House =

Museum and former residence of Victor Hugo in St. Peter Port, Guernsey

Coordinates: 49.4513°N 2.5377°W

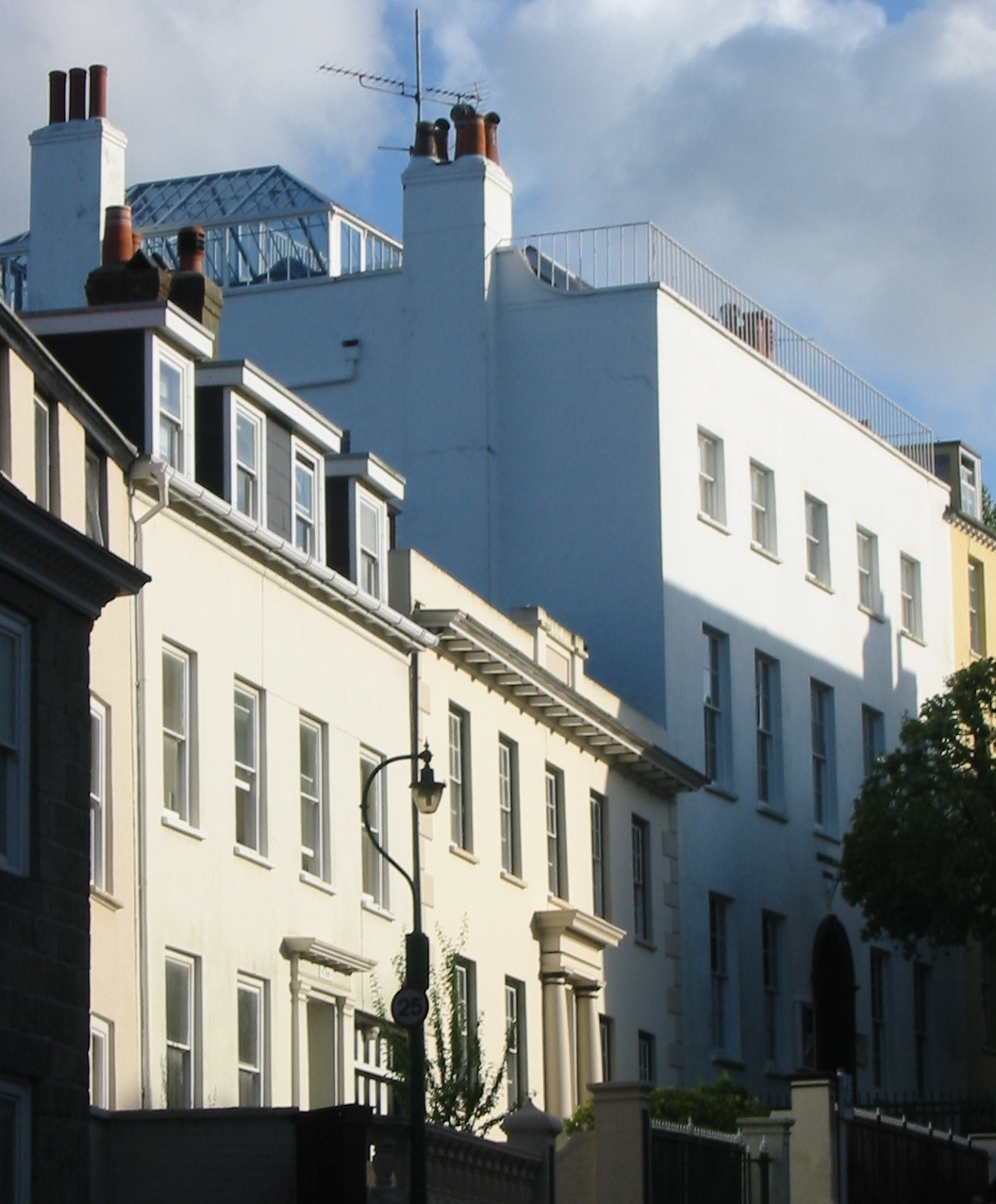
Hauteville House

Hauteville House is a house in St. Peter Port, Guernsey. Between 1856 and 1870, French writer Victor Hugo lived here during his exile from France. In March 1927, the centenary year of Romanticism, Hugo's descendants Jeanne, Jean, Marguerite and François donated the house to the City of Paris. It currently houses an honorary consul to the French embassy at London and also a museum.

== 19th century ==
Built around 1800 by an English privateer, the house came into the possession of William Ozanne. It gained the reputation of being haunted by the spirit of a woman who had committed suicide, and remained unoccupied for several years.

Victor Hugo arrived in Guernsey in October 1855. He bought the house on 16 May 1856 with the revenues from the initial success of the publication of Les Contemplations. By owning it, Hugo ensured that he could not be expelled from the island as Guernsey law prohibits the deporting of people with property on the island.

Hugo and his wife Adèle Foucher transformed, furnished and decorated the house during his exile from 1856 to 1870, and during a return visit in the summer of 1878. He named the house "Hautville", rather than Liberté, which had been his original intention. The house consists of four levels, with the top floor featuring a glazed lookout with a view of Saint Peter Port, Herm and Sark, and the islands near them. The garden is filled with trees and flowers that grow abundantly due to the mild climate.

== 20th and 21st centuries ==
The City of Paris conserves the two houses that Victor Hugo lived in the longest: the Rohan-Guéménée mansion in Paris and Hauteville House in Guernsey. Hauteville House was given to the City of Paris in 1927 by the descendants of Victor Hugo.

The structure of the building was given major renovations between 2008 and 2009, and in 2017 an appeal was launched to pay for the renovation of internal decorations.

François Pinault donated £2.6m (€3m) to renovate the interior, and the house reopened on 7 April 2019.

== Gallery photos ==
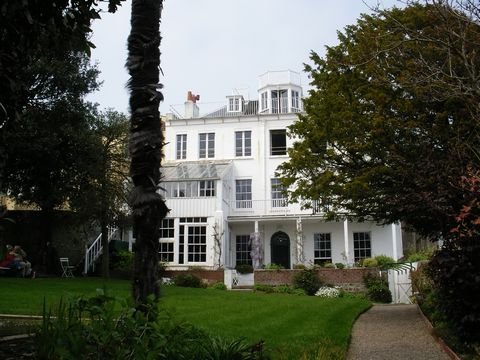
The house's garden

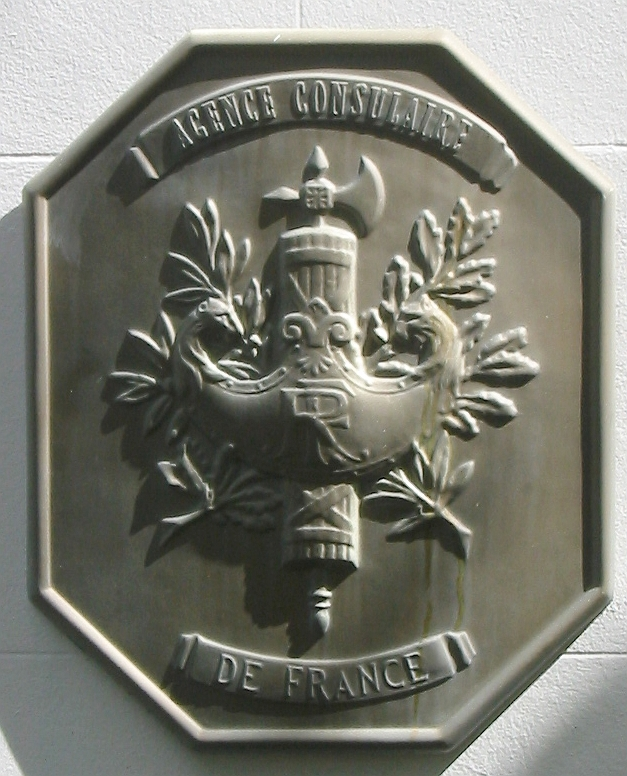
Hauteville House's consular agency plaque

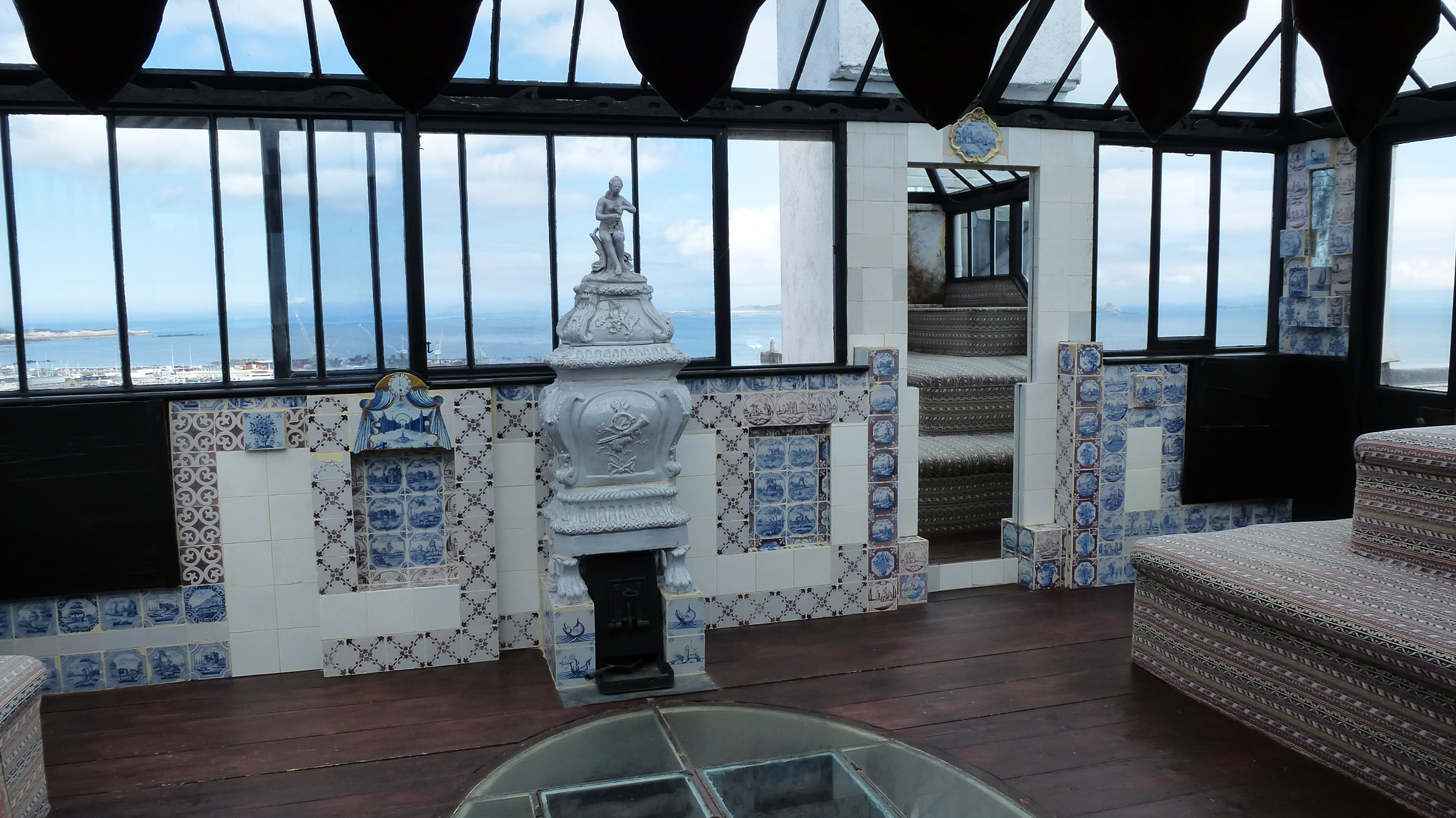
The lookout in Hauteville House, where Victor Hugo used to write.
