= Auguste Vacquerie =

French journalist and man of letters

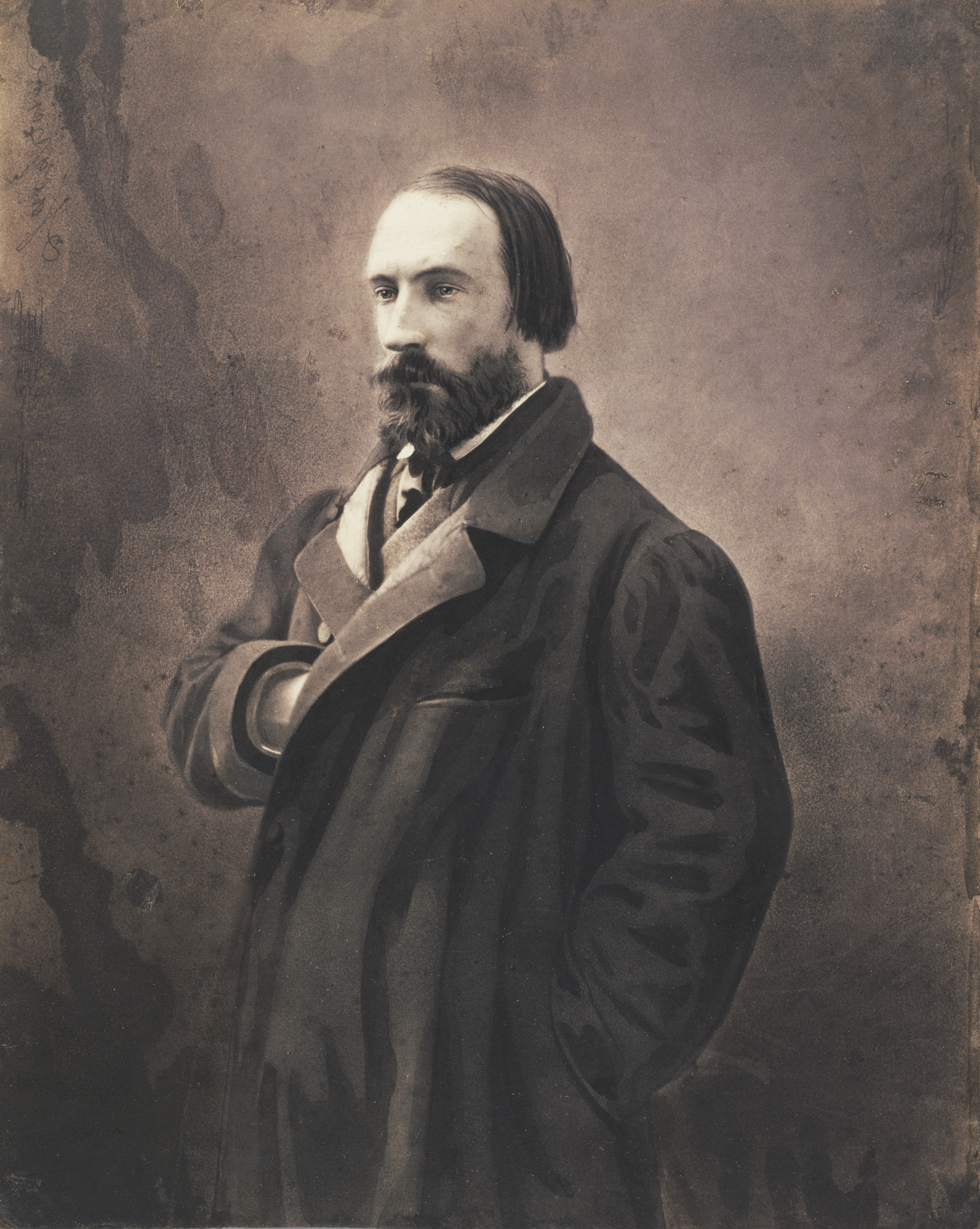
Auguste Vacquerie

Auguste Vacquerie (19 November 1819–19 February 1895) was a French journalist and man of letters.

== Biography ==
Vacquerie was born at Villequier (Seine-Maritime) on 19 November 1819. He was from his earliest days an admirer of Victor Hugo, with whom he was connected by the marriage of his brother Charles with Léopoldine Hugo. His earlier romantic productions include a volume of poems, L'Enfer de l'esprit (1840); a translation of the Antigone (1844) in collaboration with Paul Meurice; and Tragaldabas (1848), a melodrama. He was one of the principal contributors to the journal L'Événement and followed Hugo into his exile in Jersey in 1852, where he took photographs of the Hugo family and relatives. In 1869 he returned to Paris, and with Meurice and others founded the anti-imperial Rappel. His articles in this paper were more than once the occasion of legal proceedings. After 1870 he became editor of Rappel.

His other works include Souvent homme varie (1859), a comedy in verse; Jean Baudry (1863), the most successful of his plays; Aujourd'hui et demain (1875); Futura (pub. 1900), and poems on philosophical and humanitarian subjects. He published a collected edition of his plays in 1879 and a collection of essays in 1885.

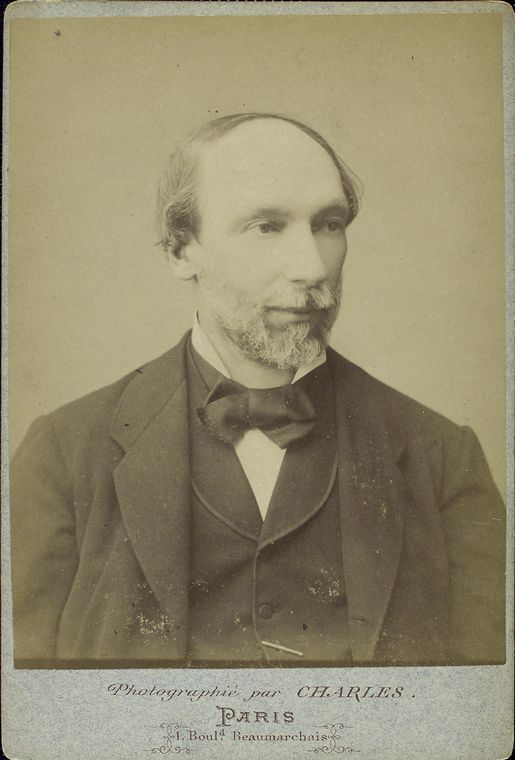
Auguste Vacquerie in mid-career.

Vacquerie died in Paris on 19 February 1895.

In the year of his death, the rue Auguste-Vacquerie, in the 16th arrondissement of Paris, was named in his honour.
