= Adèle Foucher =

Wife of Victor Hugo

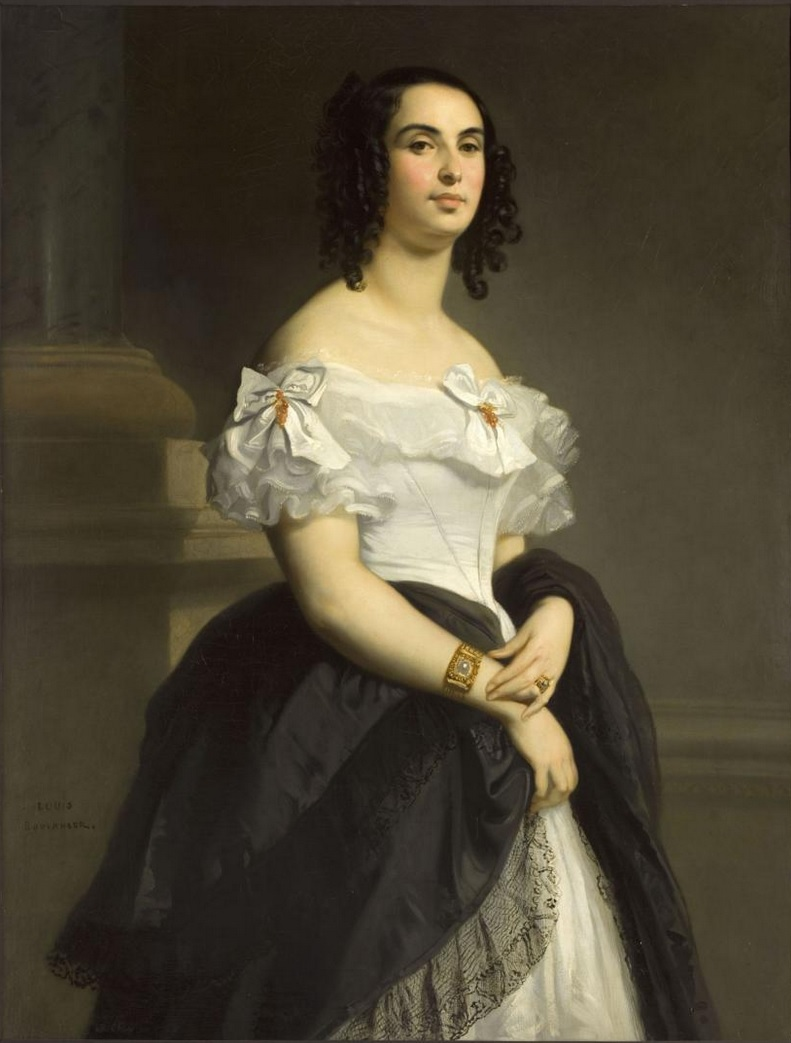
- Born: September 27, 1803; Paris, France
- Died: August 27, 1868 (age 64); Brussels, Belgium
- Resting place: Villequier, Normandy, France
- Citizenship: French
- Spouse: Victor Hugo (1822-her death)
- Children: Léopold Victor Hugo, Léopoldine Hugo, Charles Hugo, Francois-Victor Hugo, Adele Hugo

Adèle Foucher (27 September 1803 – 27 August 1868) was the wife of French writer Victor Hugo, with whom she was acquainted from childhood. Her affair with the critic Charles Augustin Sainte-Beuve became the raw material for Sainte-Beuve's 1834 novel, Volupté. Foucher wrote a biography of her husband, published in 1863.

== Early life ==
Adèle Foucher was born in Paris, the daughter of Pierre Foucher, a friend of Victor Hugo's parents. Adèle's brother, Paul Foucher, assisted Hugo by posing as the author of Hugo's play Amy Robsart, which was never published. Paul later produced a successful stage adaptation of Hugo's novel Notre-Dame de Paris.

During their courtship, Hugo wrote about 200 love letters to Foucher, most of which have been published. The couple married in a Catholic ceremony on 12 October 1822 at the Church of Saint-Sulpice. Victor's brother, Eugène Hugo, also loved Foucher, and had a mental breakdown when she married Victor.

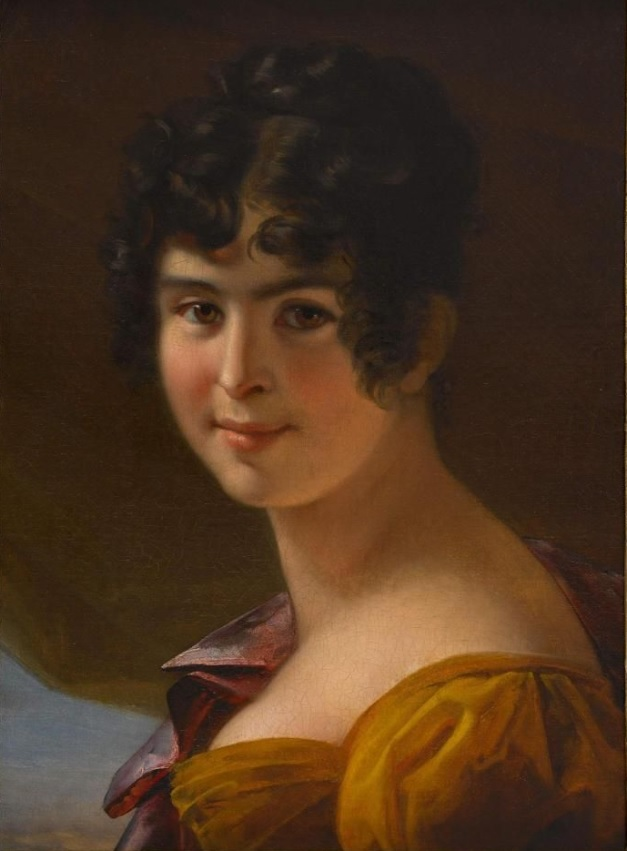
Portrait of Adèle Hugo by Julie Hugo in 1822

Foucher and Hugo's first child, Léopold, was born in 1823, but died in infancy. Next came a daughter, Léopoldine, born in 1824. Léopoldine's death in 1843, shortly after her marriage, caused great distress to her parents, and inspired many of her father's poems, especially those in Contemplations.

Another son, Charles, was born in 1826, followed by François-Victor in 1828, and another daughter, Adèle Hugo, in 1830. By this time Hugo had made his reputation as a poet and novelist. It was shortly after her youngest child's birth that Foucher ceased to have sexual relations with her husband. She then began her affair with Hugo's friend Sainte-Beuve, which lasted until around 1837.

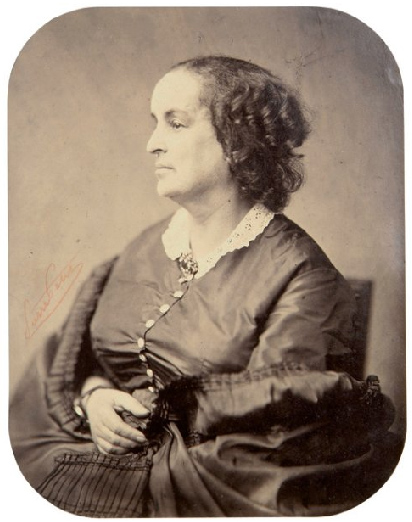
Adèle Hugo in later life, by Pierre Petit

== Later life ==
In 1833, Victor Hugo had become involved with Juliette Drouet, who became his long-term mistress. In response, Foucher gradually ended her relationship with Sainte-Beuve. Although Hugo did consider leaving Foucher at one point, they remained married, and in later life, when living on the island of Guernsey, a kind of friendship grew up between the wife and the mistress.

After a period of political activity in the 1840s, Victor Hugo fell foul of France's new leader, Napoleon III, and he left the country, going first to Brussels and then to the island of Jersey. In October 1855, he found a permanent home at Hauteville House in St Peter Port, Guernsey, and brought his family to live there with him. While living in Brussels, Foucher bought a greyhound, which after death was stuffed and preserved as an exhibit.

Foucher's biography of her husband, Victor Hugo raconté par un témoin de sa vie, was published in 1863, and was notable for excluding any mention of Victor's sexual adventures.

Foucher died of a "cerebral congestion" at the age of 64, while staying in Brussels, and was buried at Villequier, near the grave of her daughter Léopoldine; her sons accompanied the body on its journey for burial.
