= Cromwell (play) =

1827 play by Victor Hugo

Cromwell is a play by Victor Hugo, written in 1827. It was influenced by Hugo's literary circle, which identified itself as Romanticist and chose as a model dramatist Shakespeare instead of the Classicists Jean Racine and Pierre Corneille (who were supported by the French Academy).

Due to its length of 6920 verses as well as the logistical problems of recreating Hugo's very large cast of characters, the play remained unperformed until 1956. It tells the story of Oliver Cromwell's internal conflicts in being offered the crown of England. It is notable for its preface, now considered the manifesto of the Romantic movement.
