= William Shakespeare (essay) =

1864 work by Victor Hugo

William Shakespeare is an 1864 work by Victor Hugo, written in his 13th year of exile. The title is misleading; the true subject of the work is the writers that Hugo considered "the greatest geniuses of all time."

== Background ==
When Hugo began writing it he intended for it to be an introduction to a collection of French translations of Shakespeare's plays written by his son, François-Victor Hugo. However it grew to be approximately 300 pages in length and Hugo had to write a separate introduction to the plays.

== Content ==
The work begins with an approximately twenty page biography, filled with inaccuracies, and then becomes a work of literary criticism focusing on the literary geniuses of history. Shakespeare, but also Homer, Job, Aeschylus, Isaiah, Ezekiel, Lucretius, Juvenal, St. John, St. Paul, Tacitus, Dante, Rabelais, and Cervantes. Deciding there was more of Hugo in the work than Shakespeare, some French critics suggested he should have entitled it, "Myself".

Book V of Part II, The Mind and the Masses, and Book II of Part III, The Nineteenth Century, have often been combined and published as The Mind and the Masses. In it he argues for a "vast public literary domain."

Literature is the secretion of civilisation, poetry of the ideal. That is why literature is one of the wants of societies. That is why poetry is a hunger of the soul. That is why poets are the first instructors of the people. That is why Shakespeare must be translated in France. That is why Molière must be translated in England. That is why comments must be made on them. That is why there must be a vast public literary domain. That is why all poets, all philosophers, all thinkers, all the producers of the greatness of the mind must be translated, commented on, published, printed, reprinted, stereotyped, distributed, explained, recited, spread abroad, given to all, given cheaply, given at cost price, given for nothing.
