= Torquemada (play) =

Torquemada is an 1882 play by Victor Hugo about Tomás de Torquemada and the Inquisition in Spain. It criticized religious fanaticism and fanatical catholicism. It was first published in 1882, as a protest against antisemitic pogroms in Russia at the time.
