= Victor Hugo =

French writer and politician (1802–1885)

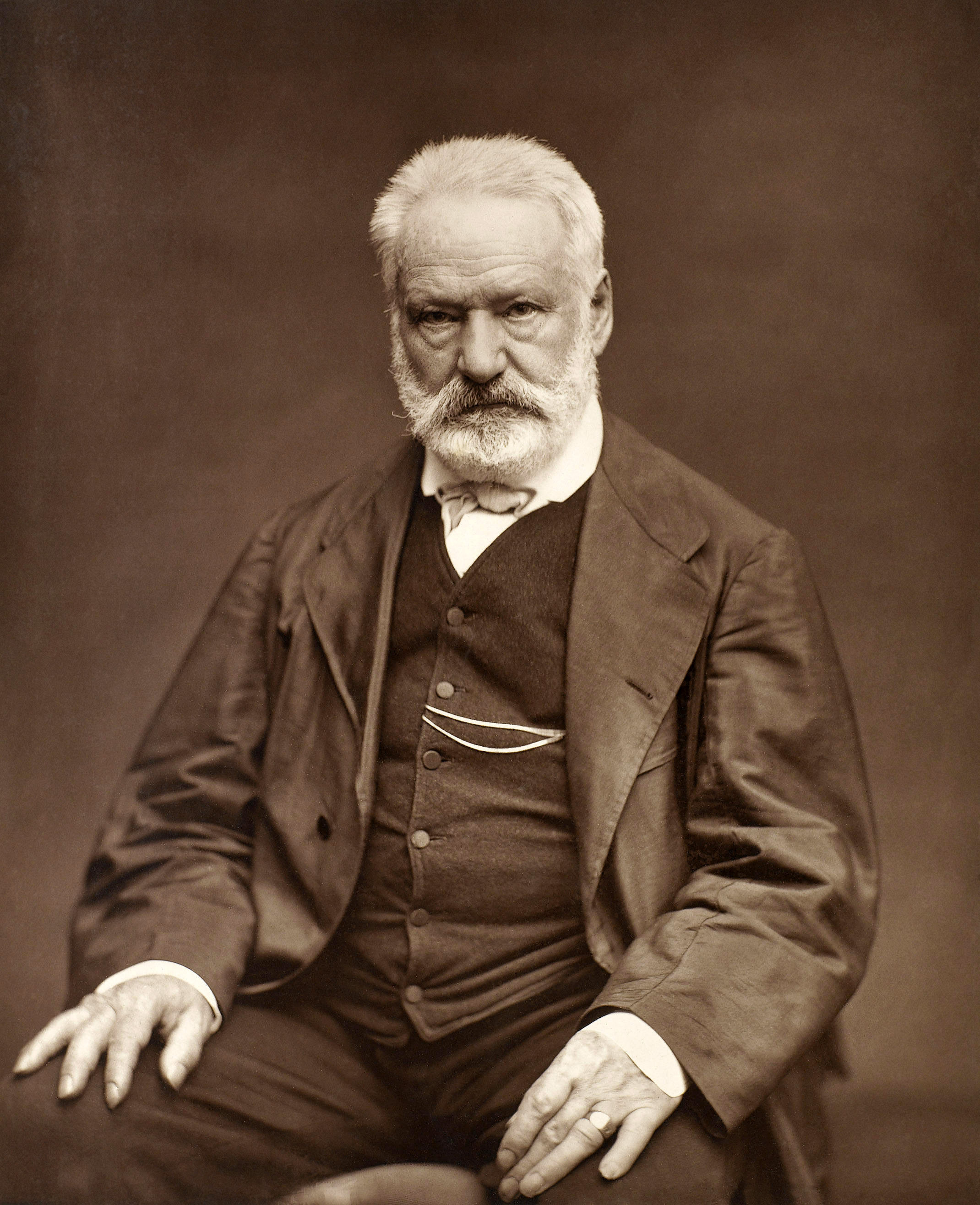
- Hugo in 1876
- Born: Victor-Marie Hugo; 26 February 1802; Besançon, France
- Died: 22 May 1885 (aged 83); Paris, France
- Resting place: Panthéon, Paris
- Occupations: Poet; novelist; dramatist; essayist; journalist; human rights activist; politician
- Political party: Party of Order (1848–1851); Independent liberal (1871); Republican Union (1876–1885)
- Spouse: Adèle Foucher (m. 1822; died 1868)
- Children: 5, including Léopoldine, Charles, François-Victor and Adèle
- Parents: Joseph Léopold Hugo; Sophie Trébuchet
- Writing career
- Years active: 1829–1883
- Genres: Novel; poetry; theatre
- Notable works: Les Misérables; Ruy Blas; The Hunchback of Notre-Dame
- Movement: Romanticism

Offices held
Senator for Seine
In office 30 January 1876 – 22 May 1882
Constituency	Paris
Member of the National Assembly for Gironde
In office 9 February 1871 – 1 March 1871
Constituency	Bordeaux
Member of the National Assembly for Seine
In office 24 April 1848 – 3 December 1851
Constituency	Paris
Peer of France
In office 13 April 1845 – February 1848
Member of the Académie française Seat 14
In office 7 January 1841 – 22 May 1885
Preceded by	Népomucène Lemercier
Succeeded by	Leconte de Lisle

Victor-Marie Hugo, vicomte Hugo (French: [viktɔʁ maʁi yɡo]; 26 February 1802 – 22 May 1885) was a French Romantic author, poet, essayist, playwright, journalist, human rights activist and politician.

His most famous works are the novels The Hunchback of Notre-Dame (1831) and Les Misérables (1862). In France, Hugo is known for his poetry collections, such as Les Contemplations and La Légende des siècles (The Legend of the Ages). Hugo was at the forefront of the Romantic literary movement with his play Cromwell and drama Hernani. His works have inspired music, both during his lifetime and after his death, including the opera Rigoletto and the musicals Les Misérables and Notre-Dame de Paris. He produced more than 4,000 drawings in his lifetime, and campaigned for social causes such as the abolition of capital punishment and slavery.

Although he was a committed royalist when young, Hugo's views changed as the decades passed, and he became a passionate supporter of republicanism, serving in politics as both deputy and senator. His work touched upon most of the political and social issues and the artistic trends of his time. His opposition to absolutism, and his literary stature, established him as a national hero. Hugo died on 22 May 1885, aged 83. He was given a state funeral in the Panthéon of Paris, which was attended by over two million people, the largest in French history.

== Early life ==
Victor-Marie Hugo was born on 26 February 1802 (7 Ventôse, year X of the Republic) in Besançon in Eastern France. He was the youngest son of Joseph Léopold Sigisbert Hugo, a general in the Napoleonic army, and Sophie Trébuchet. The couple had two other sons: Abel Joseph and Eugène. The Hugo family came from Nancy in Lorraine, where Hugo's grandfather was a wood merchant. Léopold enlisted in the army of Revolutionary France at fourteen. He was an atheist and an ardent supporter of the Republic. Hugo's mother Sophie was loyal to the deposed dynasty but would declare her children to be Protestants. They met in Châteaubriant in 1796 and married the following year.

Since Hugo's father was an officer in Napoleon's army, the family moved frequently from posting to posting. Léopold Hugo wrote to his son that he had been conceived on one of the highest peaks in the Vosges Mountains, on a journey from Lunéville to Besançon. "This elevated origin," he went on, "seems to have had effects on you so that your muse is now continually sublime." Hugo believed himself to have been conceived on 24 June 1801, which is the origin of Jean Valjean's prisoner number 24601.

In 1810, Hugo's father was made Count Hugo de Cogolludo y Sigüenza by then King of Spain Joseph Bonaparte, though it seems that the Spanish title was not legally recognized in France. Hugo later titled himself as a viscount, and it was as "Vicomte Victor Hugo" that he was appointed a peer of France on 13 April 1845.

Weary of the constant moving required by military life, Sophie separated temporarily from Léopold and settled in Paris in 1803 with her sons. There, she began seeing General Victor Fanneau de La Horie, Hugo's godfather, who had been a comrade of General Hugo's during the campaign in Vendee. In October 1807, the family rejoined Leopold, now Colonel Hugo, Governor of the province of Avellino. There, Hugo was taught mathematics by Giuseppe de Samuele Cagnazzi, elder brother of Italian scientist Luca de Samuele Cagnazzi. Sophie found out that Leopold had been living in secret with an Englishwoman called Catherine Thomas.

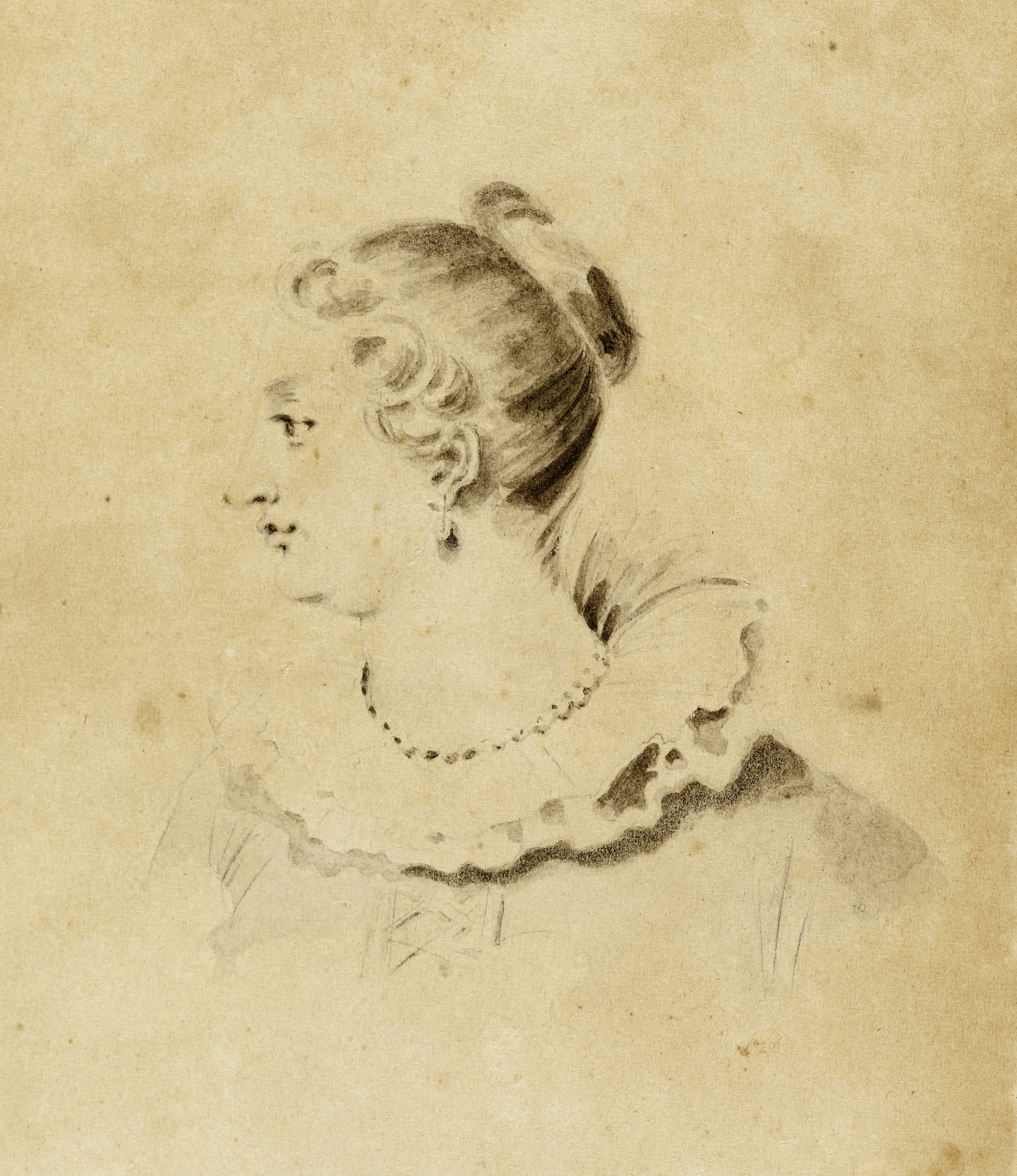
Sophie Trébuchet, mother of Victor Hugo

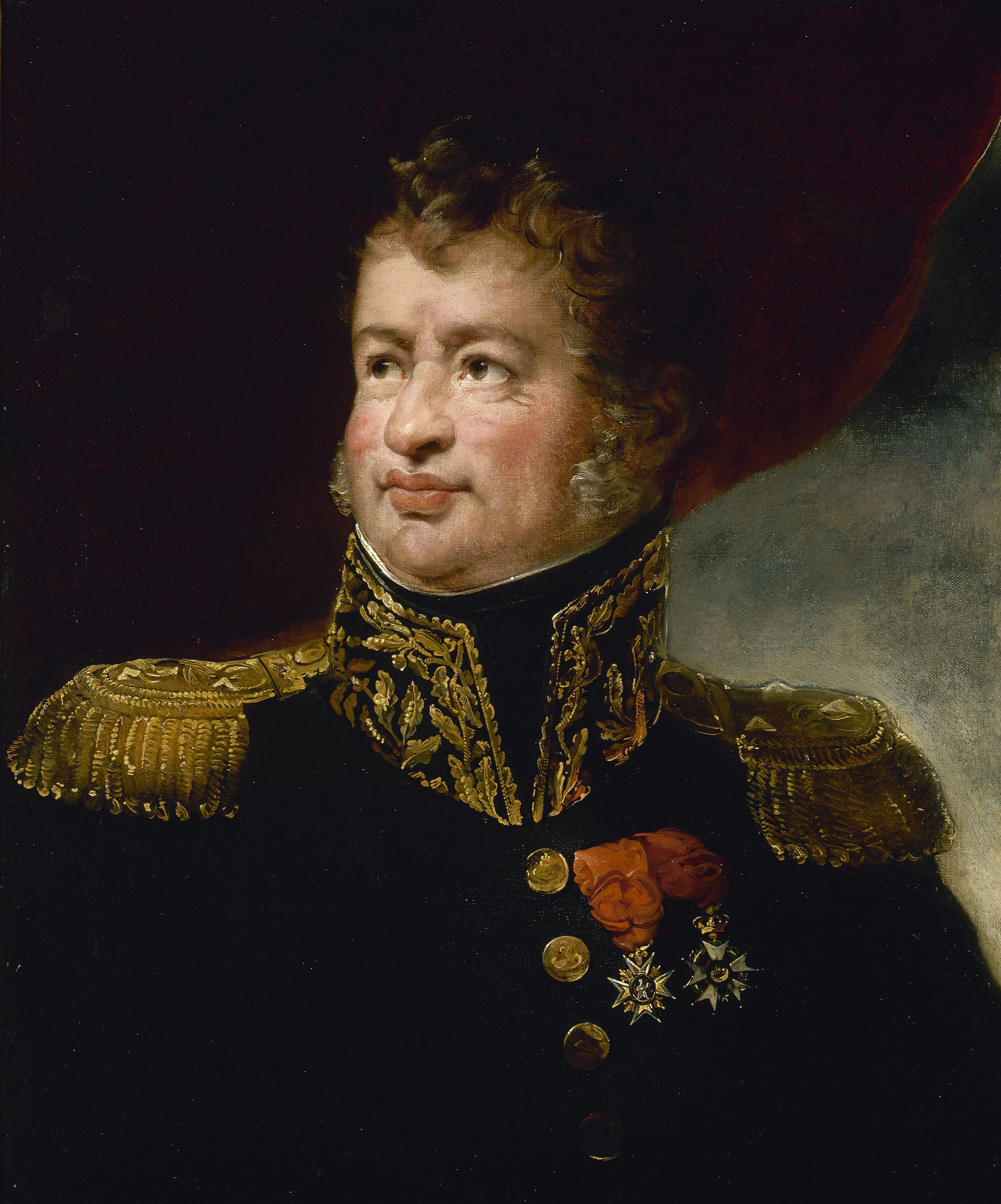
General Joseph-Leopold Hugo, father of Victor Hugo

Soon, Hugo's father was called to Spain to fight the Peninsular War. Madame Hugo and her children were sent back to Paris in 1808, where they moved to an old convent, 12 Impasse des Feuillantines, an isolated mansion in a deserted quarter of the left bank of the Seine. Hiding in a chapel at the back of the garden was de La Horie, who had conspired to restore the Bourbons and been condemned to death a few years earlier. He became a mentor to Hugo and his brothers.

In 1811, the family joined their father in Spain. Hugo and his brothers were sent to school in Madrid at the Real Colegio de San Antonio de Abad while Sophie returned to Paris on her own, now officially separated from her husband. In 1812, as the Peninsular War was turning against France, de La Horie was arrested and executed. In February 1815, Hugo and Eugène were taken away from their mother and placed by their father in the Pension Cordier, a private boarding school in Paris, where Hugo and Eugène remained for three years while also attending lectures at Lycée Louis le Grand.

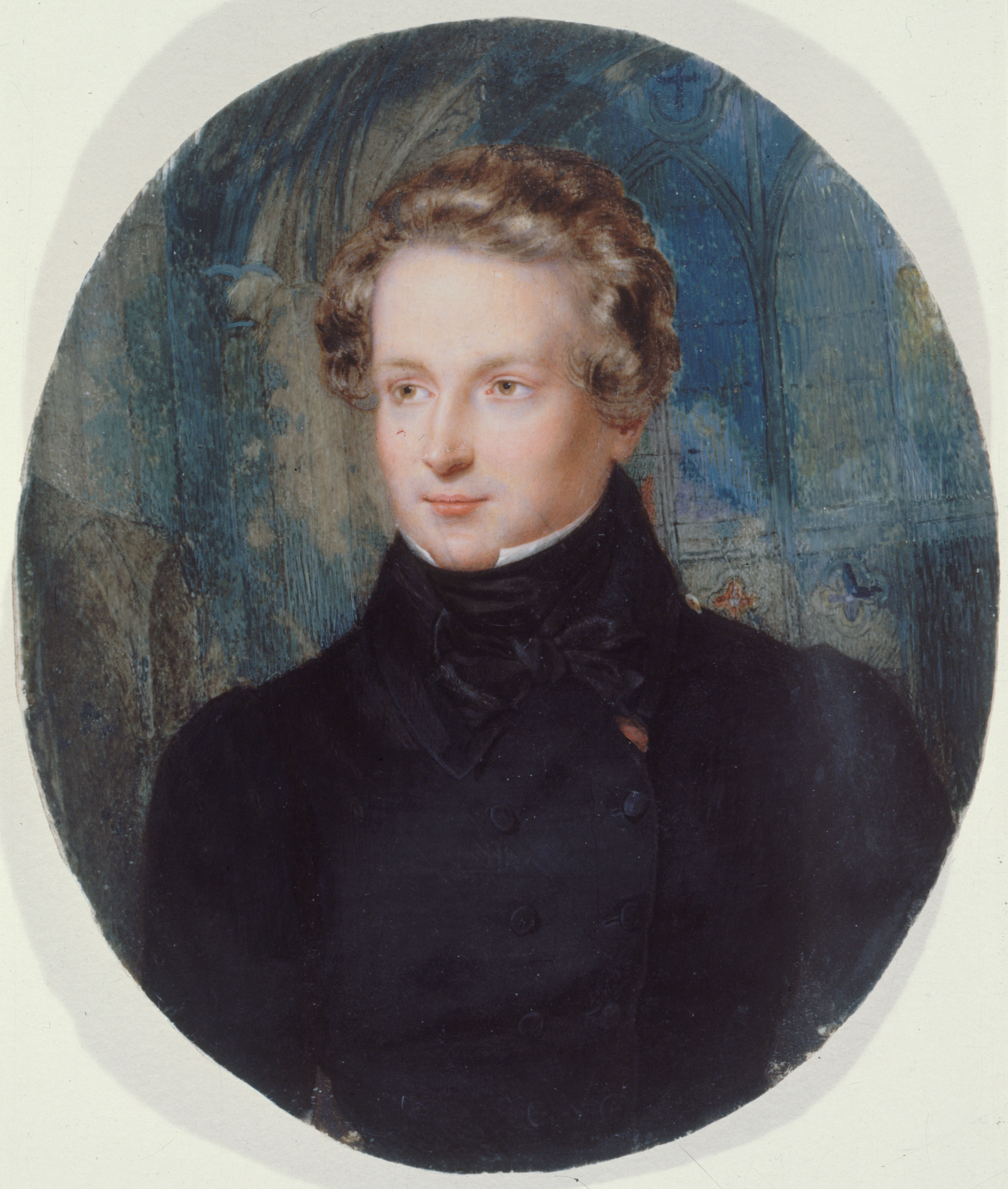
Hugo by Jean Alaux, 1825

On 10 July 1816, Hugo wrote in his diary: "I shall be Chateaubriand or nothing." In 1817, he wrote a poem for a competition organised by the Académie Française, for which he received an honorable mention. The Academicians refused to believe that he was only fifteen. Hugo moved in with his mother to 18 rue des Petits-Augustins the following year and began attending law school. Hugo fell in love and secretly became engaged, against his mother's wishes, to his childhood friend Adèle Foucher. In June 1821, Sophie Trebuchet died, and Léopold married his long-time mistress Catherine Thomas a month later. Hugo married Adèle the following year. In 1819, Hugo and his brothers began publishing a periodical called Le Conservateur littéraire.

== Career ==
Hugo published his first novel (Hans of Iceland, 1823) the year following his marriage, and his second three years later (Bug-Jargal, 1826). Between 1829 and 1840, he published five more volumes of poetry: Les Orientales, 1829; Les Feuilles d'automne, 1831; Les Chants du crépuscule, 1835; Les Voix intérieures, 1837; and Les Rayons et les Ombres, 1840. This cemented his reputation as one of the greatest elegiac and lyric poets of his time.

Like many young writers of his generation, Hugo was profoundly influenced by François-René de Chateaubriand, the famous figure in the literary movement of Romanticism and France's pre-eminent literary figure during the early 19th century. In his youth, Hugo resolved to be "Chateaubriand or nothing", and his life would come to parallel that of his predecessor in many ways. Like Chateaubriand, Hugo furthered the cause of Romanticism, became involved in politics (though mostly as a champion of Republicanism), and was forced into exile due to his political stances. Along with Chateaubriand he attended the Coronation of Charles X in Reims in 1825.

The precocious passion and eloquence of Hugo's early work brought success and fame at an early age. His first collection of poetry (Odes et poésies diverses) was published in 1822 when he was only 20 years old and earned him a royal pension from Louis XVIII. Though the poems were admired for their spontaneous fervor and fluency, the collection that followed four years later in 1826 (Odes et Ballades) revealed Hugo to be a great poet, a natural master of lyric and creative song.

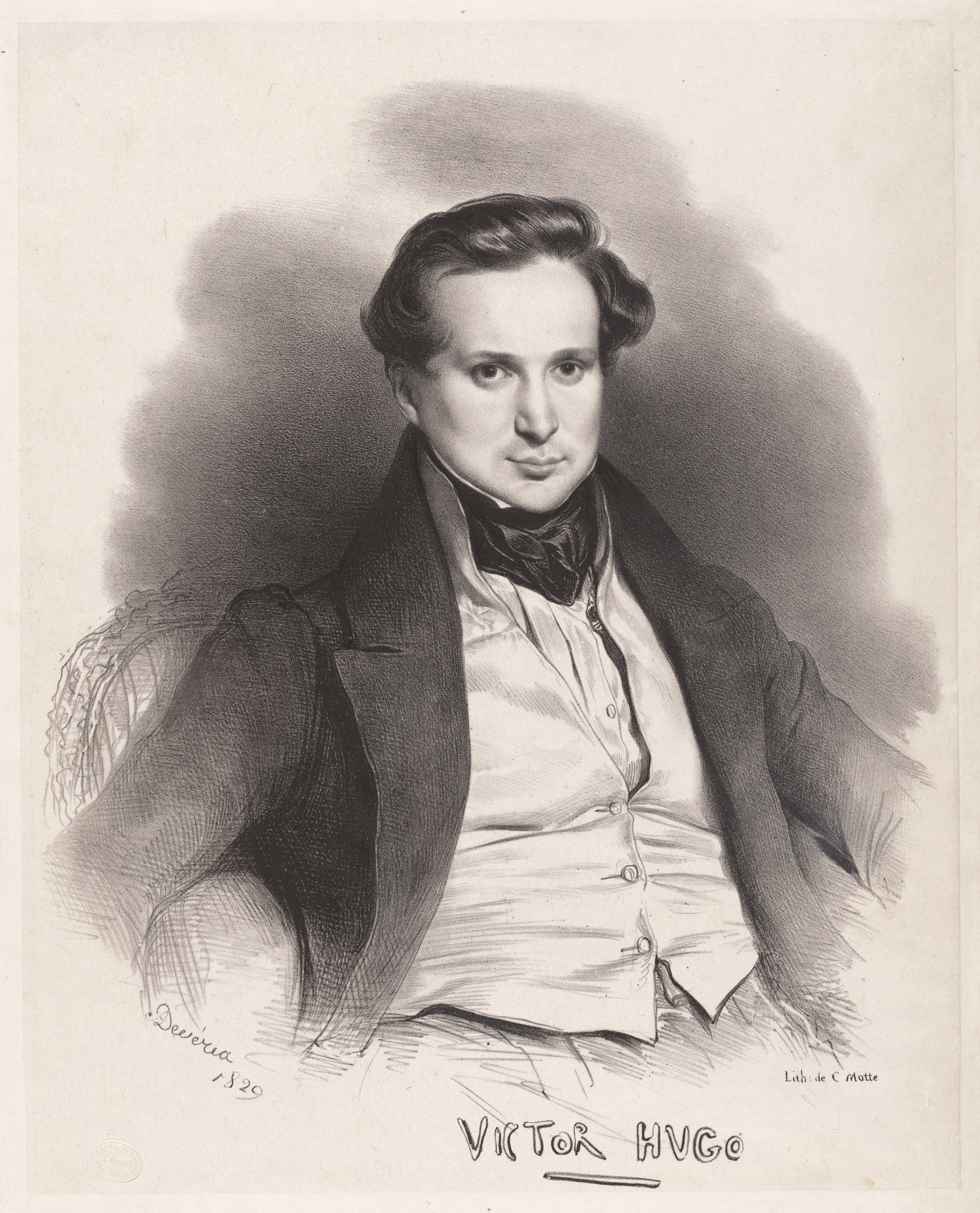
Victor Hugo in 1829, lithograph by Achille Devéria in the collection of the National Gallery of Art, Washington D.C.

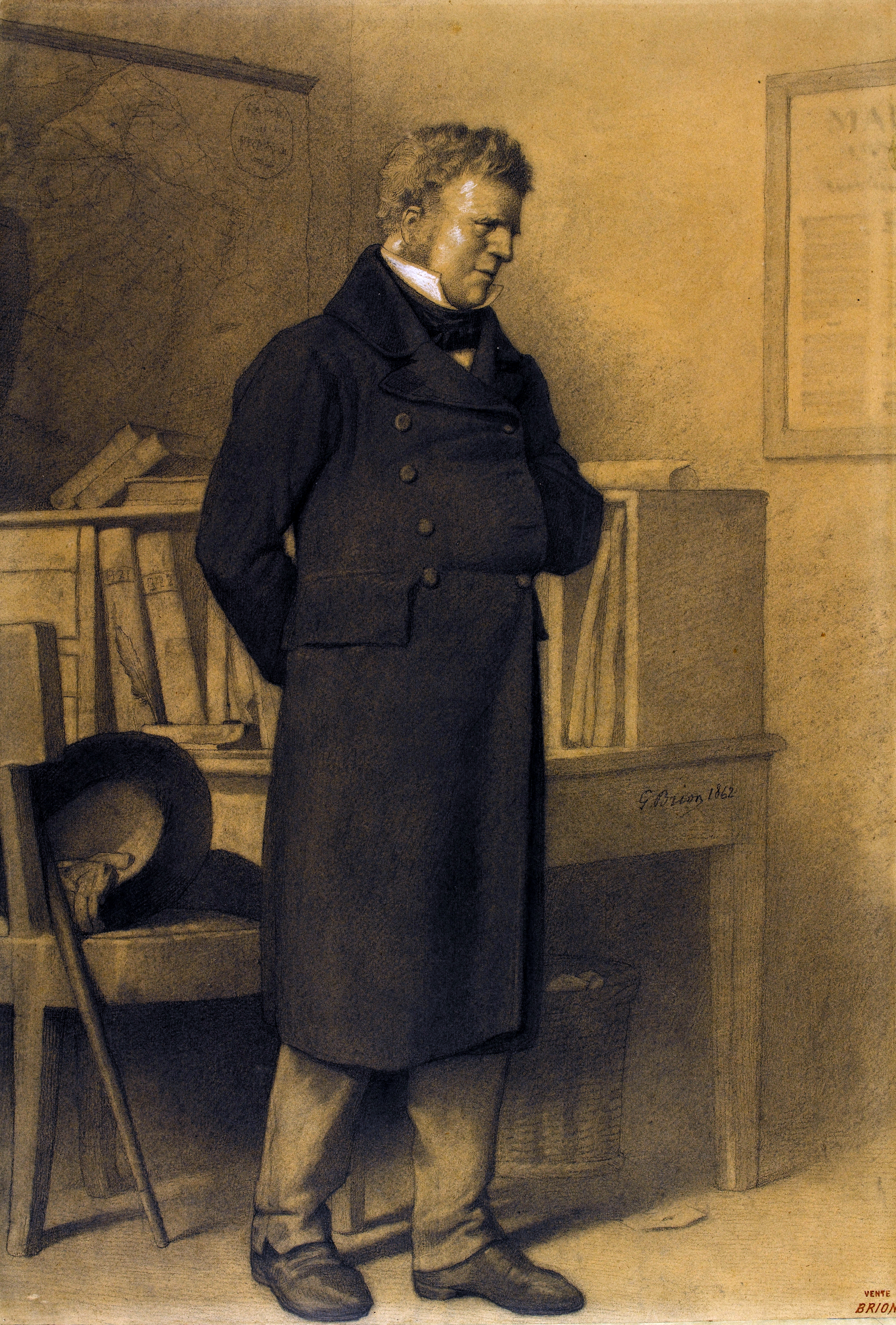
Jean Valjean (also known as Monsieur Madeleine in the book) is the principal character in Hugo's great novel, Les Misérables.

Victor Hugo's first mature work of fiction was published in February 1829 by Charles Gosselin without the author's name and reflected the acute social conscience that would infuse his later work. Le Dernier jour d'un condamné (The Last Day of a Condemned Man) would have a profound influence on later writers such as Albert Camus, Charles Dickens, and Fyodor Dostoyevsky. Claude Gueux, a documentary short story about a real-life murderer who had been executed in France, was published in 1834. Hugo himself later considered it to be a precursor to his great work on social injustice, Les Misérables.

Hugo became the figurehead of the Romantic literary movement with the plays Cromwell (1827) and Hernani (1830). Hernani announced the arrival of French romanticism: performed at the Comédie-Française, it was greeted with several nights of rioting as romantics and traditionalists clashed over the play's deliberate disregard for neo-classical rules. Hugo's popularity as a playwright grew with subsequent plays, such as Marion Delorme (1831), Le roi s'amuse (1832), and Ruy Blas (1838). Hugo's novel Notre-Dame de Paris (The Hunchback of Notre-Dame) was published in 1831 and quickly translated into other languages across Europe. One of the effects of the novel was to shame the City of Paris into restoring the much neglected Cathedral of Notre Dame, which was attracting thousands of tourists who had read the popular novel.

Hugo began planning a major novel about social misery and injustice as early as the 1830s, but a full 17 years were needed for Les Misérables to be realised and finally published in 1862. Hugo had previously used the departure of prisoners for the Bagne of Toulon in Le Dernier Jour d'un condamné. He went to Toulon to visit the Bagne in 1839 and took extensive notes, though he did not start writing the book until 1845. On one of the pages of his notes about the prison, he wrote in large block letters a possible name for his hero: "JEAN TRÉJEAN". When the book was finally written, Tréjean became Jean Valjean.

Hugo was acutely aware of the quality of the novel, as evidenced in a letter he wrote to his publisher, Albert Lacroix, on 23 March 1862: "My conviction is that this book is going to be one of the peaks, if not the crowning point of my work." Publication of Les Misérables went to the highest bidder. The Belgian publishing house Lacroix and Verboeckhoven undertook a marketing campaign unusual for the time, issuing press releases about the work a full six months before the launch. It also initially published only the first part of the novel ("Fantine"), which was launched simultaneously in major cities. Installments of the book sold out within hours and had an enormous impact on French society.

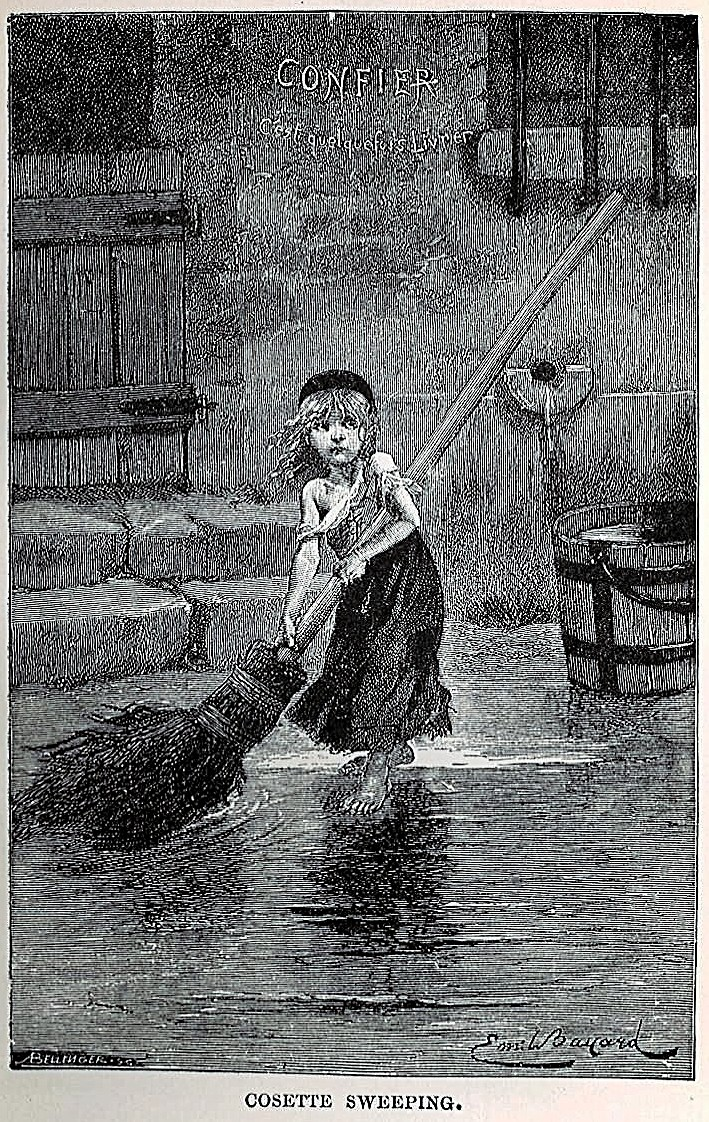
Illustration by Émile Bayard from the original edition of Les Misérables (1862)

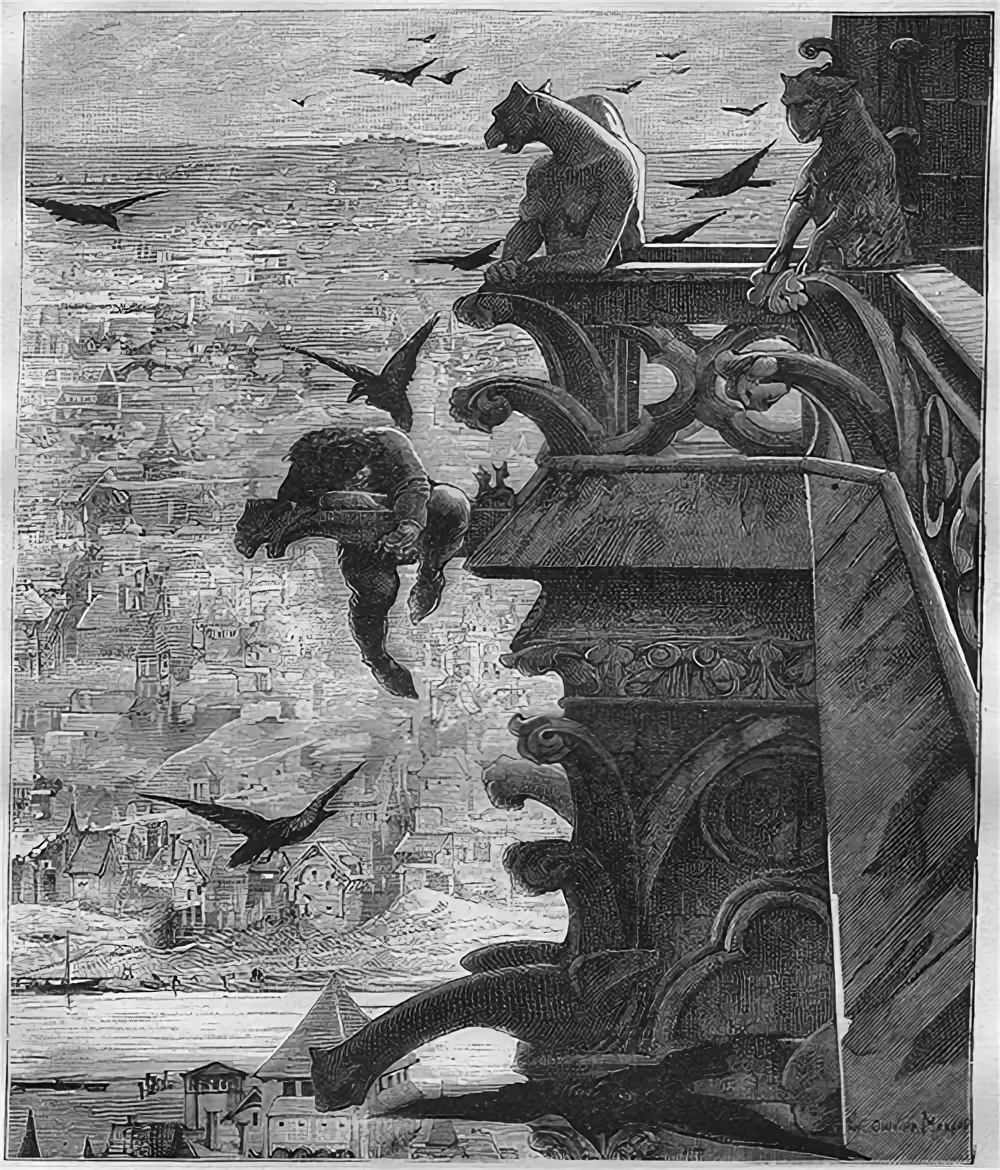
Illustration by Luc-Olivier Merson for Notre-Dame de Paris (1881)

The critical establishment was generally hostile to the novel; Taine found it insincere, Barbey d'Aurevilly complained of its vulgarity, Gustave Flaubert found within it "neither truth nor greatness", the Goncourt brothers lambasted its artificiality, and Baudelaire—despite giving favourable reviews in newspapers—castigated it in private as "repulsive and inept". However, Les Misérables proved popular enough with the masses that the issues it highlighted were soon on the agenda of the National Assembly of France. Today, the novel remains his best-known work. It is popular worldwide and has been adapted for cinema, television, and stage shows.

An apocryphal tale has circulated, describing the shortest correspondence in history as having been between Hugo and his publisher Hurst and Blackett in 1862. Hugo was on vacation when Les Misérables was published. He queried the reaction to the work by sending a single-character telegram to his publisher, asking ?. The publisher replied with a single ! to indicate its success. Hugo turned away from social/political issues in his next novel, Les Travailleurs de la Mer (Toilers of the Sea), published in 1866. The book was well received, perhaps due to the previous success of Les Misérables. Dedicated to the channel island of Guernsey, where Hugo spent 15 years of exile, the novel tells of a man who attempts to win the approval of his beloved's father by rescuing his ship, intentionally marooned by its captain who hopes to escape with a treasure of money it is transporting, through an exhausting battle of human engineering against the force of the sea and an almost mythical beast of the sea, a giant squid. Superficially an adventure, one of Hugo's biographers calls it a "metaphor for the 19th century–technical progress, creative genius and hard work overcoming the immanent evil of the material world."

The word used in Guernsey to refer to squid (pieuvre, also sometimes applied to octopus) was to enter the French language as a result of its use in the book. Hugo returned to political and social issues in his next novel, L'Homme Qui Rit (The Man Who Laughs), which was published in 1869 and painted a critical picture of the aristocracy. The novel was not as successful as his previous efforts, and Hugo himself began to comment on the growing distance between himself and literary contemporaries such as Flaubert and Émile Zola, whose realist and naturalist novels were now exceeding the popularity of his own work.

His last novel, Quatre-vingt-treize (Ninety-Three), published in 1874, dealt with a subject that Hugo had previously avoided: the Reign of Terror during the French Revolution. Though Hugo's popularity was on the decline at the time of its publication, many now consider Ninety-Three to be a work on par with Hugo's better-known novels.

== Political life and self-exile ==
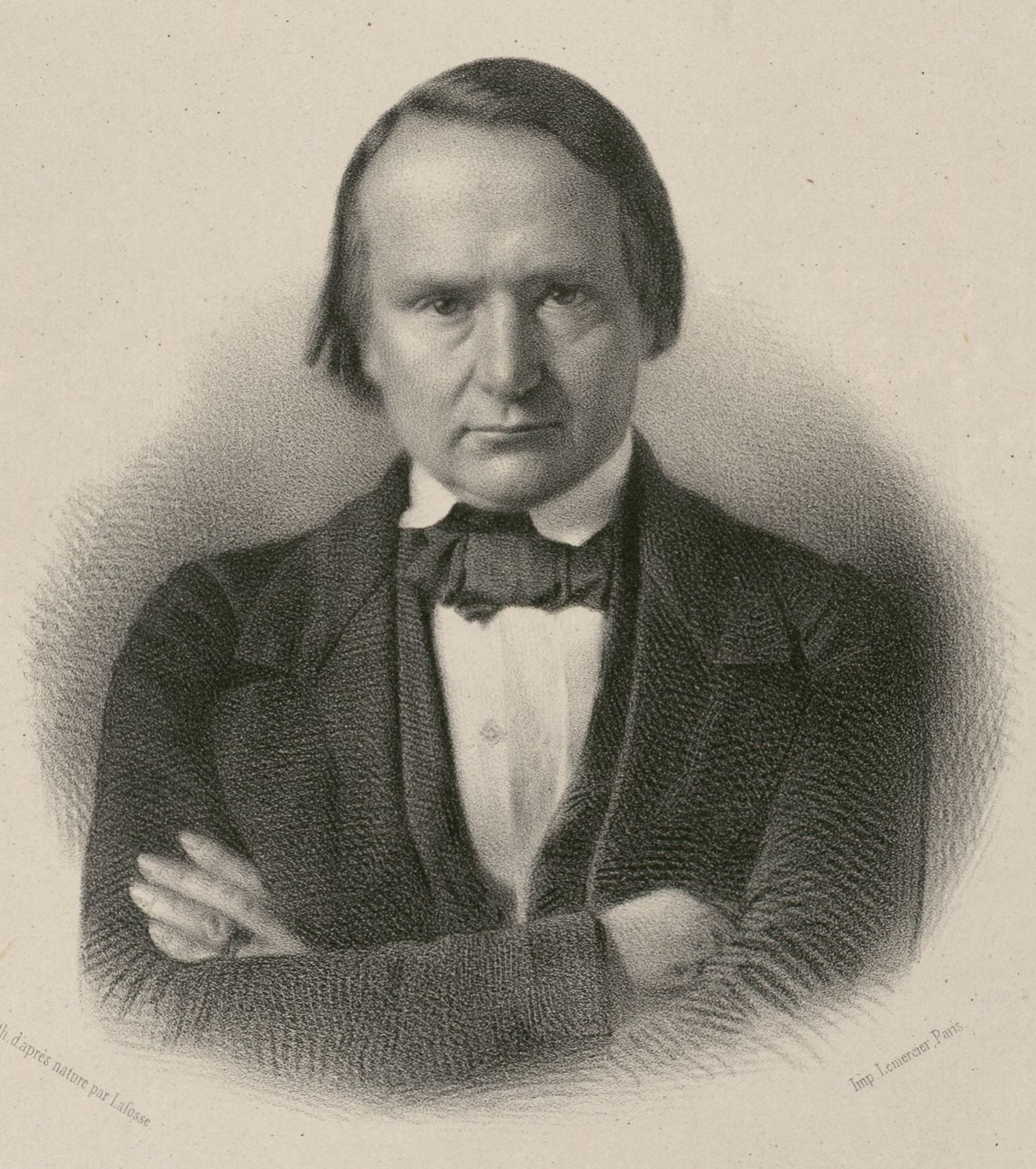
Portrait as member of the National Assembly of the Second Republic, 1848

After three unsuccessful attempts, Hugo was finally elected to the Académie française in 1841, solidifying his position in the world of French arts and letters. A group of French academicians, particularly Étienne de Jouy, were fighting against the "romantic evolution" and had managed to delay Victor Hugo's election. Thereafter, he became increasingly involved in French politics.

On the nomination of King Louis Philippe I, Hugo entered the Upper Chamber of Parliament as a pair de France in 1845, where he spoke against the death penalty and social injustice, and in favour of freedom of the press and self-government for Poland.

In 1848, Hugo was elected to the National Assembly of the Second Republic as a conservative. In 1849, he broke with the conservatives when he gave a noted speech calling for the end of misery and poverty. Other speeches called for universal suffrage and free education for all children. Hugo's advocacy to abolish the death penalty was renowned internationally. (Note: These parliamentary speeches are published in Œuvres complètes: actes et paroles I : avant l'exil, 1841–1851. Scroll down to the Assemblée Constituante 1848 heading and subsequent pages.)

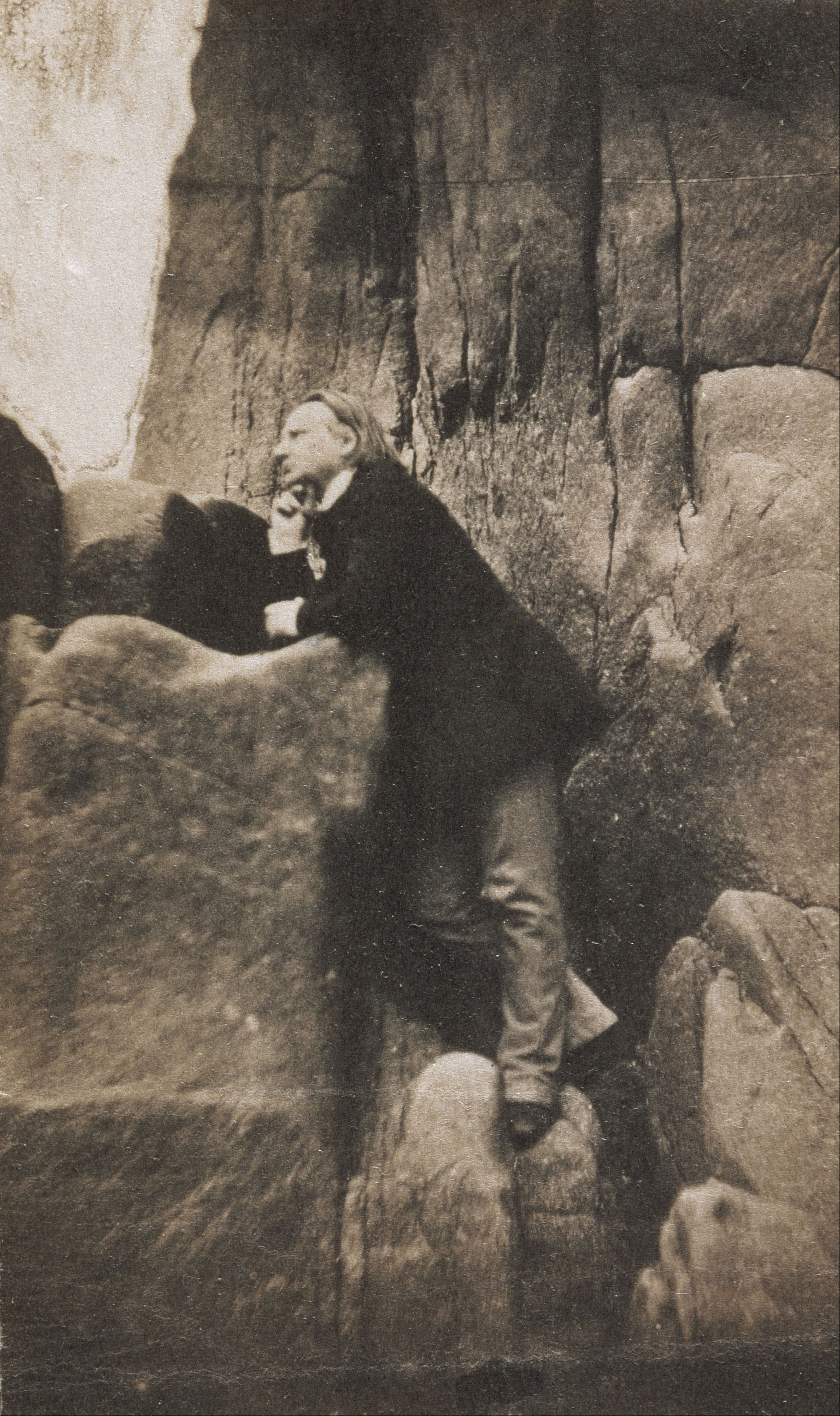
Among the Rocks in Jersey (1853–1855)

When Louis Napoleon (Napoleon III) seized complete power in 1851, establishing an anti-parliamentary constitution, Hugo openly declared him a traitor to France. He moved to Brussels, then Jersey, from which he was expelled for supporting L'Homme, a local newspaper that had published a letter to Queen Victoria by a French republican deemed treasonous. He finally settled with his family at Hauteville House in Saint Peter Port, Guernsey, where he would live in self-imposed exile from October 1855 until 1870.

While in self-exile, Hugo published his famous political pamphlets against Napoleon III, Napoléon le Petit and Histoire d'un crime. The pamphlets were banned in France but nonetheless had a strong impact there. He also composed or published some of his best work during his period in Guernsey, including Les Misérables and three widely praised collections of poetry (Les Châtiments, 1853; Les Contemplations, 1856; and La Légende des siècles, 1859).

=== Writings on Slavery and Colonialism ===
Hugo's work frequently touched on slavery, notably while describing the fate of Thérnardier in Les Misérables:

The wretched moral character of Thénardier, the frustrated bourgeois, was hopeless; it was in America what it had been in Europe. Contact with a wicked man is sometimes enough to rot a good deed and cause something bad to come out of it. With Marius's money, Thénardier became a slave trader.

Like most of his contemporaries, Hugo justified colonialism in terms of a civilizing mission and putting an end to the slave trade on the Barbary coast. In a speech delivered on 18 May 1879, during a banquet to celebrate the abolition of slavery, in the presence of the French abolitionist writer and parliamentarian Victor Schœlcher, Hugo declared that the Mediterranean Sea formed a natural divide between "ultimate civilisation and... utter barbarism." Hugo declared that "God offers Africa to Europe. Take it" and "in the nineteenth century the white man made a man out of the black, in the twentieth century Europe will make a world out of Africa".

This might partly explain why, in spite of his deep interest and involvement in political matters, he remained silent on the Algerian issue. He knew about the atrocities committed by the French Army during the French conquest of Algeria as evidenced by his diary but he never denounced them publicly; however, in Les Misérables, Hugo wrote: "Algeria too harshly conquered, and, as in the case of India by the English, with more barbarism than civilization."

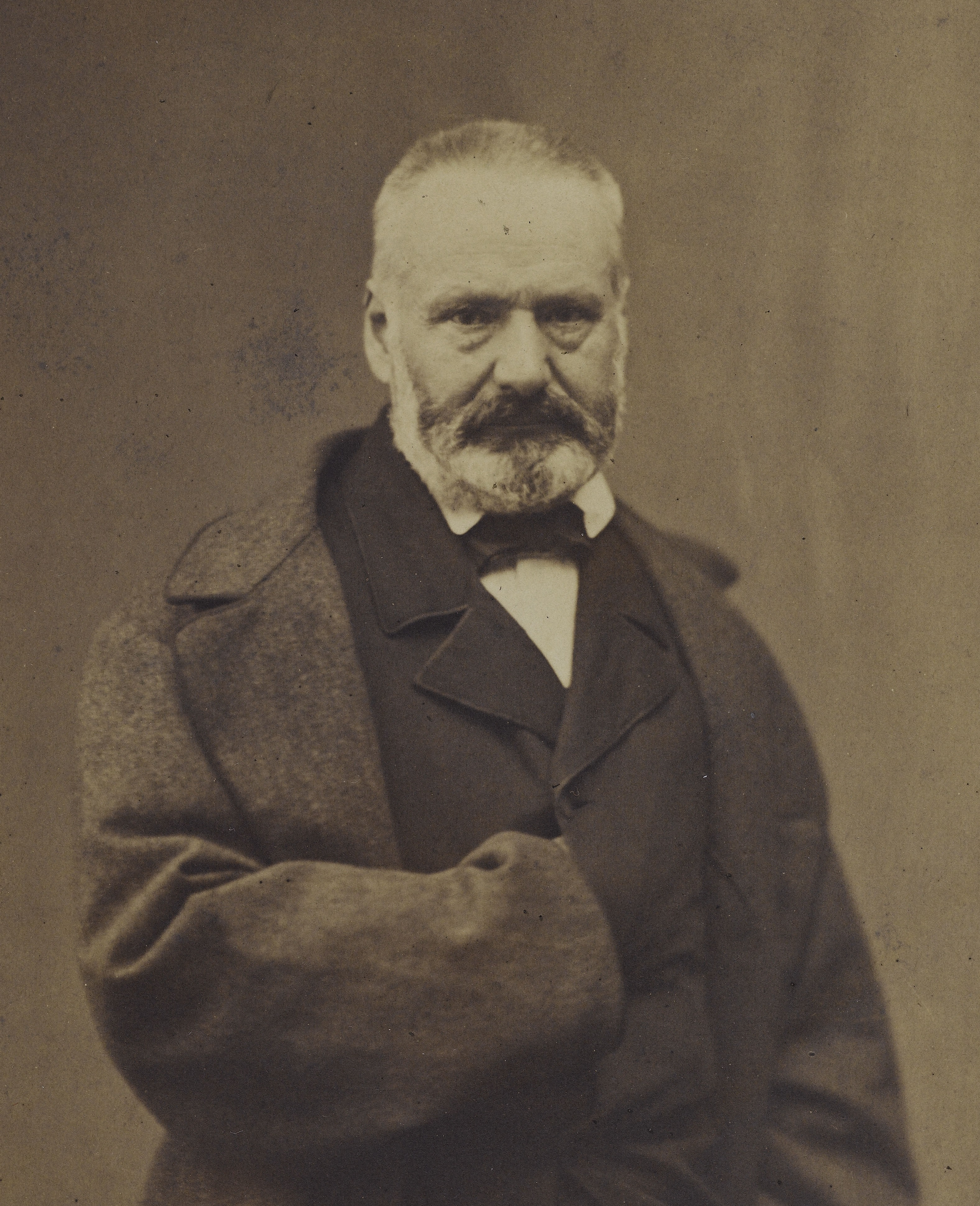
Victor Hugo in 1861

After coming in contact with Victor Schœlcher, a writer who fought for the abolition of slavery and French colonialism in the Caribbean, he started strongly campaigning against slavery. In a letter to American abolitionist Maria Weston Chapman, on 6 July 1851, Hugo wrote: "Slavery in the United States! It is the duty of this republic to set such a bad example no longer... The United States must renounce slavery, or they must renounce liberty." In 1859, he wrote a letter asking the United States government, for the sake of their own reputation in the future, to spare abolitionist John Brown's life, Hugo justified Brown's actions by these words: "Assuredly, if insurrection is ever a sacred duty, it must be when it is directed against Slavery." Hugo agreed to diffuse and sell one of his best known drawings, "Le Pendu", an homage to John Brown, so one could "keep alive in souls the memory of this liberator of our black brothers, of this heroic martyr John Brown, who died for Christ just as Christ.

Only one slave on Earth is enough to dishonour the freedom of all men. So the abolition of slavery is, at this hour, the supreme goal of the thinkers.

— Victor Hugo, 17 January 1862,

=== Campaign against the Death Penalty ===
As a novelist, diarist, and member of Parliament, Victor Hugo fought a lifelong battle for the abolition of the death penalty. The Last Day of a Condemned Man published in 1829 analyses the pangs of a man awaiting execution; several entries in Things Seen (Choses vues), the diary he kept between 1830 and 1885, convey his firm condemnation of what he regarded as a barbaric sentence; on 15 September 1848, seven months after the Revolution of 1848, he delivered a speech before the Assembly and concluded, "You have overthrown the throne. ... Now overthrow the scaffold." His influence was credited in the removal of the death penalty from the constitutions of Geneva, Portugal, and Colombia. He had also pleaded for Benito Juárez to spare the recently captured emperor Maximilian I of Mexico, but to no avail.

=== Return from Exile ===
Although Napoleon III granted an amnesty to all political exiles in 1859, Hugo declined, as it meant he would have to curtail his criticisms of the government. It was only after Napoleon III fell from power and the Third Republic was proclaimed that Hugo finally returned to his homeland in 1870, where he was promptly elected to the National Assembly and the Senate.

He was in Paris during the siege by the Prussian Army in 1870, famously eating animals given to him by the Paris Zoo. As the siege continued, and food became ever more scarce, he wrote in his diary that he was reduced to "eating the unknown".

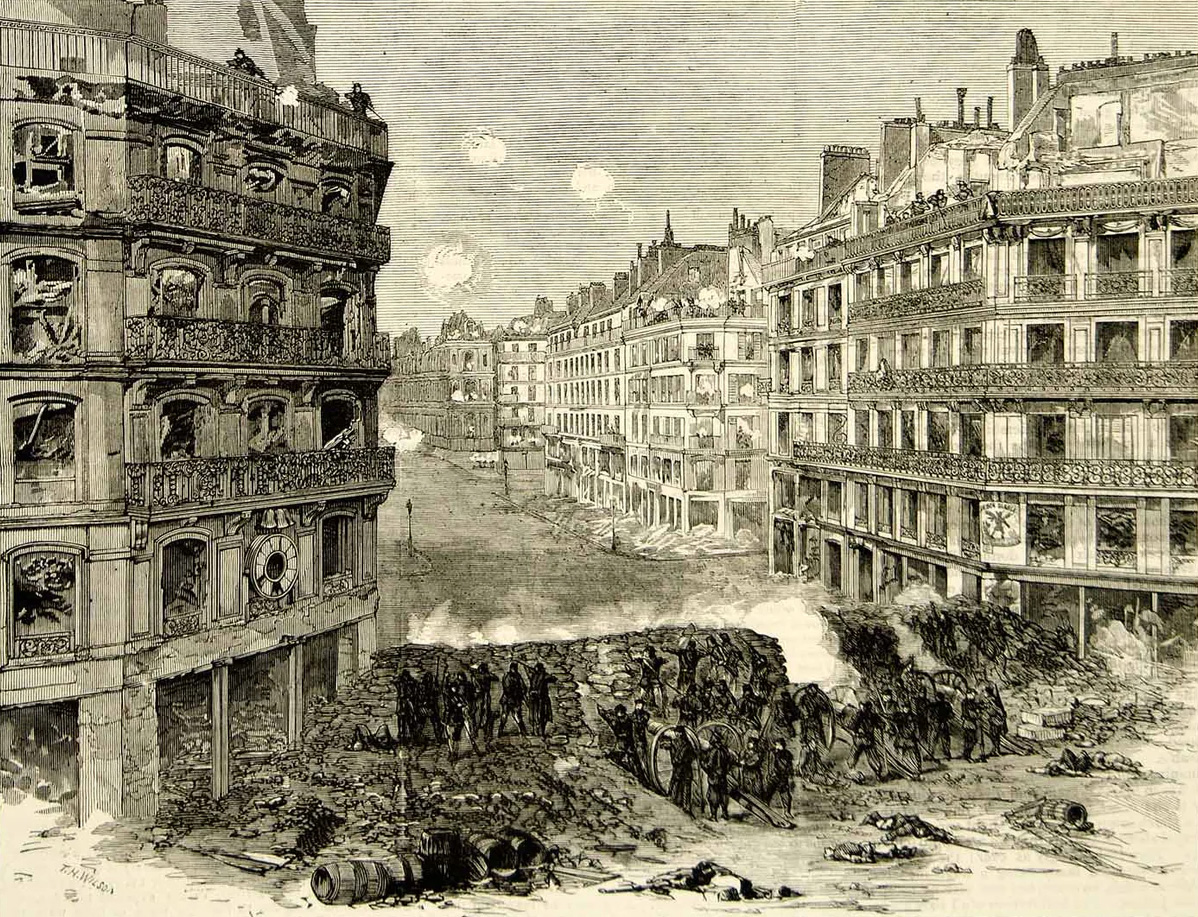
Communards defending a barricade on the Rue de Rivoli

During the Paris Commune—the revolutionary government that took power on 18 March 1871 and was toppled on 28 May—Victor Hugo was harshly critical of the atrocities committed on both sides. On 9 April, he wrote in his diary, "In short, this Commune is as idiotic as the National Assembly is ferocious. From both sides, folly." Yet he made a point of offering his support to members of the Commune subjected to brutal repression. He had been in Brussels since 22 March 1871 when in the 27 May issue of the Belgian newspaper l'Indépendance Victor Hugo denounced the government's refusal to grant political asylum to the Communards threatened with imprisonment, banishment or execution. This caused so much uproar that in the evening a mob of fifty to sixty men attempted to force their way into the writer's house shouting, "Death to Victor Hugo! Hang him! Death to the scoundrel!"

Hugo, who said "A war between Europeans is a civil war," was a strong advocate for the creation of the United States of Europe. He expounded his views on the subject in a speech he delivered during the International Peace Congress which took place in Paris in 1849. Here he declared "nations of the continent, will, without losing your distinctive qualities and glorious individuality, be blended into a superior unity and constitute a European fraternity, just as Normandy, Brittany, Burgundy, Lorraine, have been blended into France", this new state would be administered by "a great Sovereign senate which will be to Europe what the Parliament is to England".

Because of his concern for the rights of artists and copyright, he was a founding member of the Association Littéraire et Artistique Internationale, which led to the Berne Convention for the Protection of Literary and Artistic Works. However, in Pauvert's published archives, he states strongly that "any work of art has two authors: the people who confusingly feel something, a creator who translates these feelings, and the people again who consecrate his vision of that feeling. When one of the authors dies, the rights should totally be granted back to the other, the people." He was one of the earlier supporters of the concept of domaine public payant, under which a nominal fee would be charged for copying or performing works in the public domain, and this would go into a common fund dedicated to helping artists, especially young people.

== Religious views ==
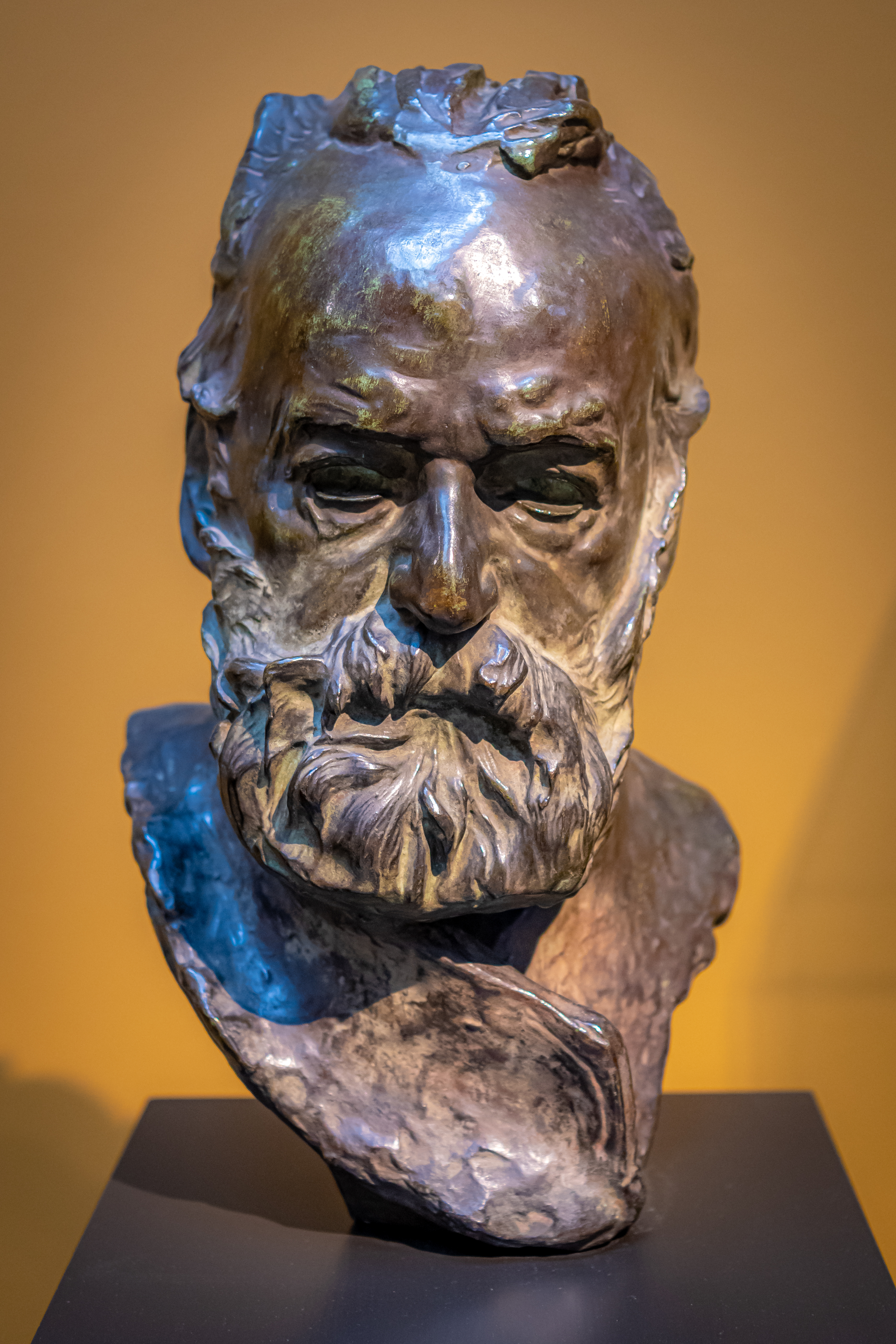
Head of Victor Hugo modeled by the sculptor Auguste Rodin and conserved at the Ny Carlsberg Glyptotek in Copenhagen

Hugo's religious views changed radically over the course of his life. In his youth and under the influence of his mother, he identified as a Catholic and professed respect for Church hierarchy and authority. From there he became a non-practising Catholic and increasingly expressed anti-Catholic and anti-clerical views. He frequented spiritism during his exile (where he participated also in many séances conducted by Madame Delphine de Girardin) and in later years settled into a rationalist deism similar to that espoused by Voltaire. A census-taker asked Hugo in 1872 if he was a Catholic, and he replied, "No. A Freethinker."

After 1872, Hugo never lost his antipathy towards the Catholic Church. He felt the Church was indifferent to the plight of the working class under the oppression of the monarchy. Perhaps he also was upset by the frequency with which his work appeared on the Church's list of banned books. Hugo counted 740 attacks on Les Misérables in the Catholic press. When Hugo's sons Charles and François-Victor died, he insisted that they be buried without a crucifix or priest. In his will, he made the same stipulation about his own death and funeral.

Yet he believed in life after death and prayed every single morning and night, convinced as he wrote in The Man Who Laughs that "Thanksgiving has wings and flies to its right destination. Your prayer knows its way better than you do."

Hugo's rationalism can be found in poems such as Torquemada (1869, about religious fanaticism), The Pope (1878, anti-clerical), Religions and Religion (1880, denying the usefulness of churches) and, published posthumously, The End of Satan and God (1886 and 1891 respectively, in which he represents Christianity as a griffin and rationalism as an angel). The Hunchback of Notre-Dame also garnered attention due to its portrayal of the abuse of power by the church, even getting listed as one of the "forbidden books" by it. In fact, earlier adaptations had to change the villain, Claude Frollo from being a priest to avoid backlash.

Vincent van Gogh ascribed the saying "Religions pass away, but God remains," actually by Jules Michelet, to Hugo.

== Relationship with music ==
Although Hugo's many talents did not include exceptional musical ability, he nevertheless had a great impact on the music world through the inspiration that his works provided for composers of the 19th and 20th centuries. Hugo himself particularly enjoyed the music of Gluck, Mozart, Weber and Meyerbeer. In Les Misérables, he calls the huntsman's chorus in Weber's Euryanthe "perhaps the most beautiful piece of music ever composed". He also greatly admired Beethoven and, rather unusually for his time, appreciated works by composers from earlier centuries such as Palestrina and Monteverdi.

Two famous musicians of the 19th century were friends of Hugo: Hector Berlioz and Franz Liszt. The latter played Beethoven in Hugo's home, and Hugo joked in a letter to a friend that, thanks to Liszt's piano lessons, he learned how to play a favourite song on the piano – with only one finger.

Hugo also worked with composer Louise Bertin, writing the libretto for her 1836 opera La Esmeralda, which was based on the character in The Hunchback of Notre Dame. Although for various reasons the opera closed soon after its fifth performance and is little known today, it has enjoyed a modern revival, both in a piano/song concert version by Liszt at the Festival international Victor Hugo et Égaux 2007 and in a full orchestral version presented in July 2008 at Le Festival de Radio France et Montpellier Languedoc-Roussillon.

Hugo was also on friendly terms with Frederic Chopin. He introduced him to Amantine de Francueil (known as "George Sand" despite being female) who became Chopin's lover. In 1849, Hugo attended Chopin's funeral. On the other hand, he had low esteem for Richard Wagner, whom he described as "a man of talent coupled with imbecility."

Well over one thousand musical compositions have been inspired by Hugo's works from the 19th century until the present day. In particular, Hugo's plays, in which he rejected the rules of classical theatre in favour of romantic drama, attracted the interest of many composers who adapted them into operas. More than one hundred operas are based on Hugo's works and among them are Donizetti's Lucrezia Borgia (1833), Verdi's Rigoletto (1851) and Ernani (1844), and Ponchielli's La Gioconda (1876).

Hugo's novels, as well as his plays, have been a great source of inspiration for musicians, stirring them to create not only opera and ballet but musical theatre such as Notre-Dame de Paris and the ever-popular Les Misérables, London's West End's longest running musical. Moreover, Hugo's poems have attracted an exceptional amount of interest from musicians, and numerous melodies have been based on his poetry by composers such as Berlioz, Bizet, Fauré, Franck, Lalo, Liszt, Massenet, Saint-Saëns, Rachmaninoff, and Wagner. Composers Eugenie Santa Coloma Sourget and Dagmar Rybner also used Hugo's texts in their songs.

Today, Hugo's work continues to stimulate musicians to create new compositions. For example, Hugo's novel against capital punishment, The Last Day of a Condemned Man, was adapted into an opera by David Alagna, with a libretto by Frédérico Alagna and premièred by their brother, tenor Roberto Alagna, in 2007. In Guernsey, every two years, the Victor Hugo International Music Festival attracts a wide range of musicians and the premiere of songs specially commissioned from such composers as Guillaume Connesson, Richard Dubugnon, Olivier Kaspar, and Thierry Escaich and based on Hugo's poetry.

Remarkably, not only has Hugo's literary production been the source of inspiration for musical works, but also his political writings have received attention from musicians and have been adapted to music. For instance, in 2009, Italian composer Matteo Sommacal was commissioned by Festival "Bagliori d'autore" and wrote a piece for speaker and chamber ensemble entitled Actes et paroles, with a text elaborated by Chiara Piola Caselli after Victor Hugo's last political speech addressed to the Assemblée législative, "Sur la Revision de la Constitution" (18 July 1851), and premiered in Rome on 19 November 2009, in the auditorium of the Institut français, Centre Saint-Louis, French Embassy to the Holy See, by Piccola Accademia degli Specchi featuring the composer Matthias Kadar.

== Declining years and death ==
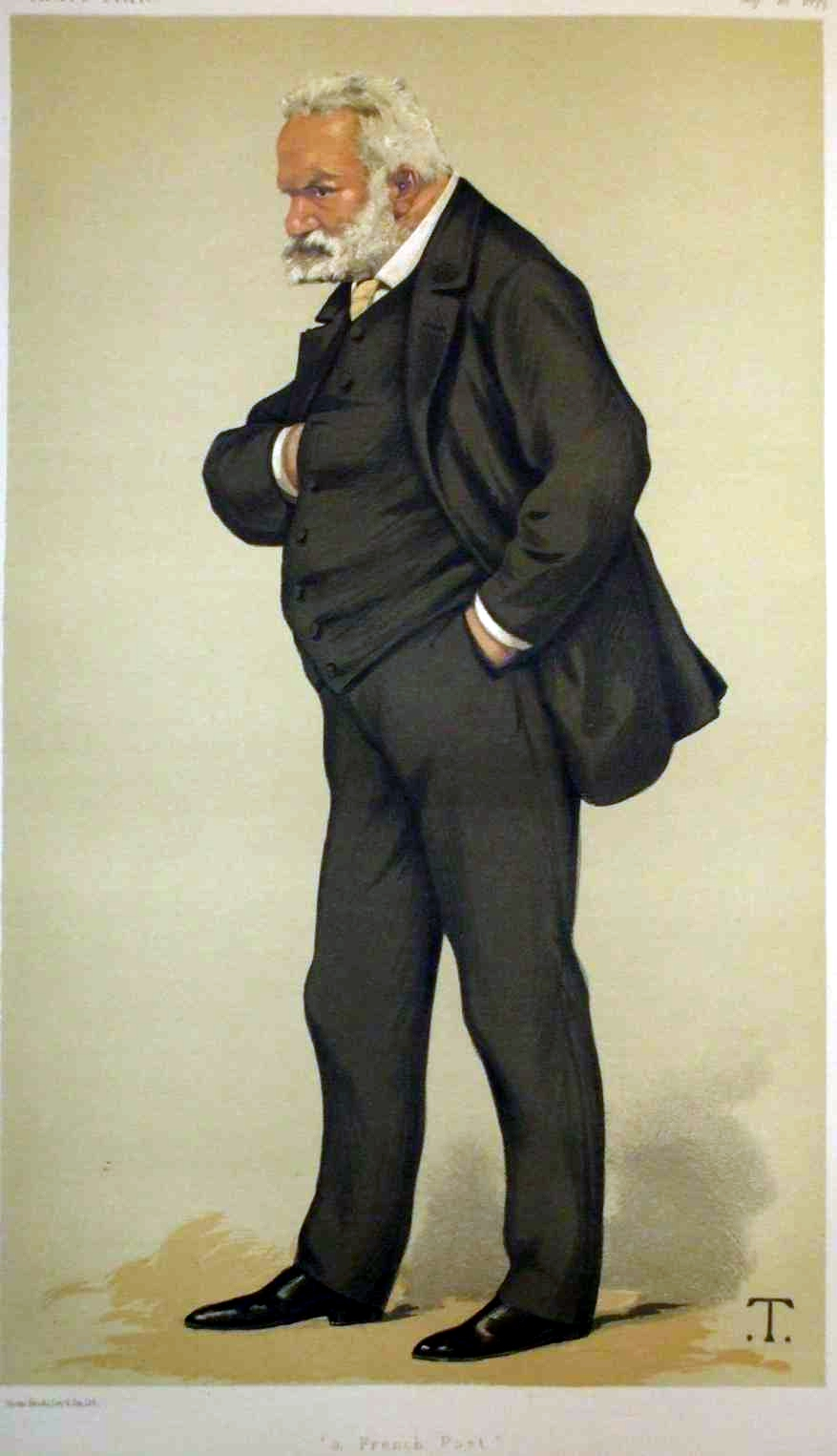
Caricature of Hugo in the London magazine Vanity Fair, September 1879

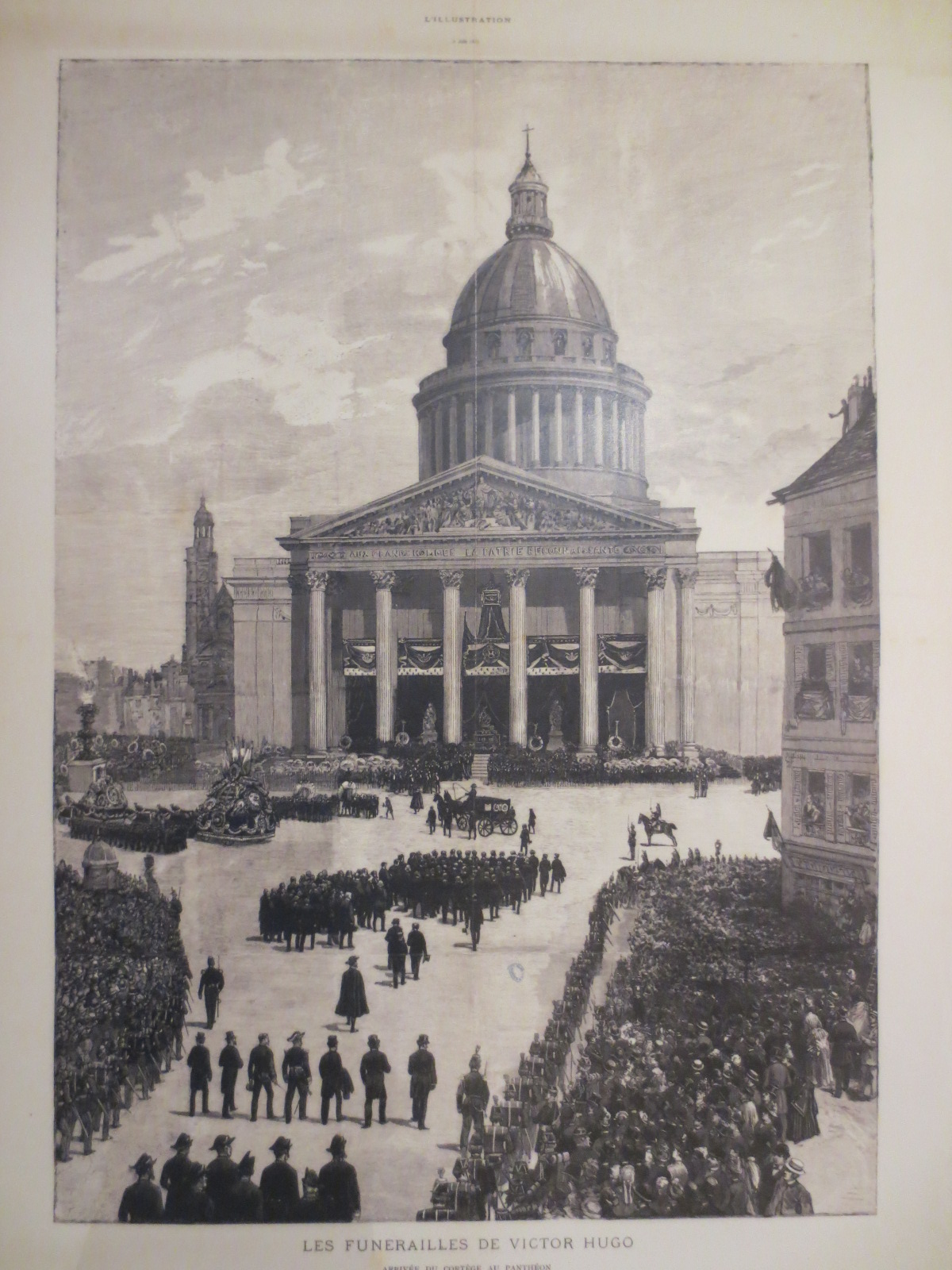
Funeral procession of Victor Hugo arriving at the Panthéon

When Hugo returned to Paris in 1870, the country hailed him as a national hero. He was confident that he would be offered the dictatorship, as shown by the notes he kept at the time: "Dictatorship is a crime. This is a crime I am going to commit," but he felt he had to assume that responsibility. Despite his popularity, Hugo lost his bid for re-election to the National Assembly in 1872.

Throughout his life Hugo kept believing in unstoppable humanistic progress. In his last public address on 3 August 1879 he prophesied, in an over-optimistic way, "In the twentieth century, war will be dead; the scaffold will be dead; hatred will be dead; frontier boundaries will be dead; dogmas will be dead; man will live."

Within a brief period, he suffered a mild stroke, his daughter Adèle was interned in an insane asylum, and his two sons died. (Adèle's biography inspired the movie The Story of Adele H.) His wife Adèle had died in 1868. His faithful mistress Juliette Drouet died in 1883, only two years before his own death.

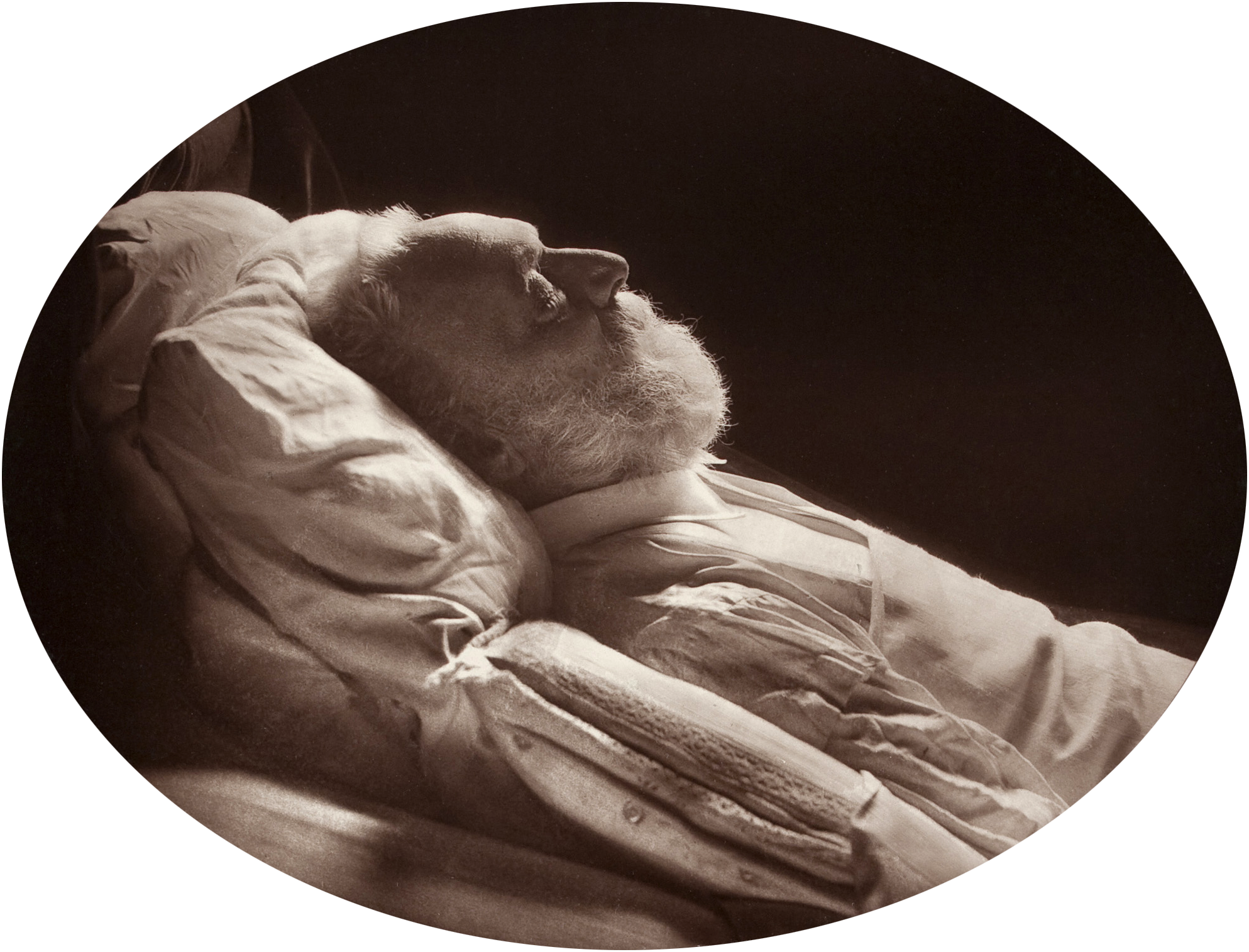
Hugo on his deathbed (photographed by Nadar)

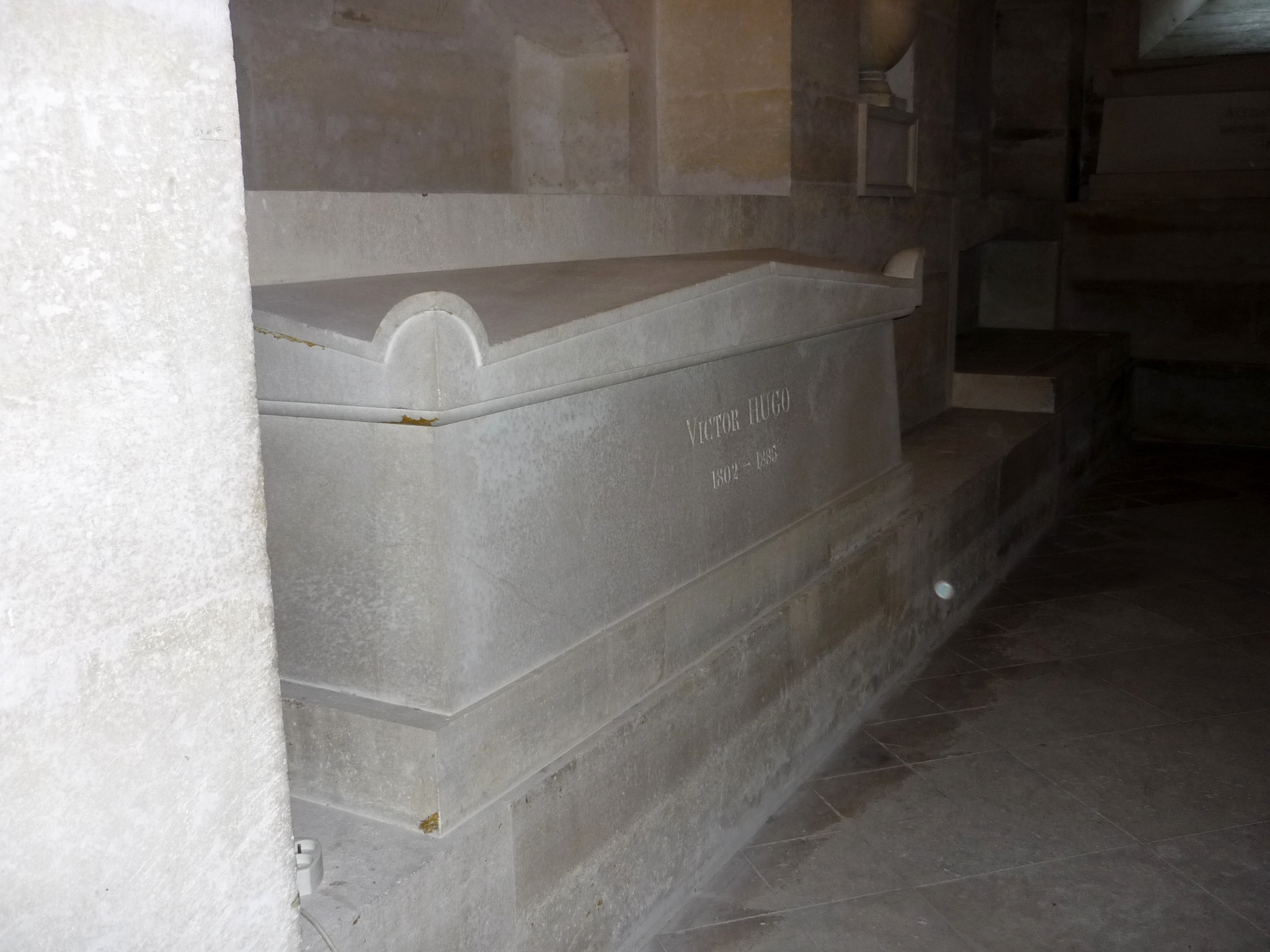
Tomb of Victor Hugo at the Panthéon

Despite his personal loss, Hugo remained committed to the cause of political change. On 30 January 1876, he was elected to the newly created Senate. This last phase of his political career was considered a failure. Hugo was a maverick and achieved little in the Senate. He suffered a mild stroke on 27 June 1878. To honour the fact that he was entering his 80th year, he received one of the greatest tributes to a living writer ever held. The celebrations began on 25 June 1881, when Hugo was presented with a Sèvres vase, the traditional gift for sovereigns. On 27 June, one of the largest parades in French history was held.

Marchers stretched from the Avenue d'Eylau, where the author was living, down the Champs-Élysées, and all the way to the centre of Paris. The paraders marched for six hours past Hugo as he sat at the window at his house. Every inch and detail of the event was for Hugo; the official guides even wore cornflowers as an allusion to Fantine's song in Les Misérables. On 28 June, the city of Paris changed the name of the Avenue d'Eylau to Avenue Victor-Hugo. Letters addressed to the author were from then on labelled "To Mister Victor Hugo, In his avenue, Paris". Two days before dying, he left a note with these last words: "To love is to act."

On 20 May 1885, le Petit Journal published the official medical bulletin on Hugo's health condition. "The illustrious patient" was fully conscious and aware that there was no hope for him. They also reported from a reliable source that at one point in the night he had whispered the following alexandrin, "En moi c’est le combat du jour et de la nuit."—"In me, this is the battle between day and night." Le Matin published a slightly different version: "Here is the battle between day and night."

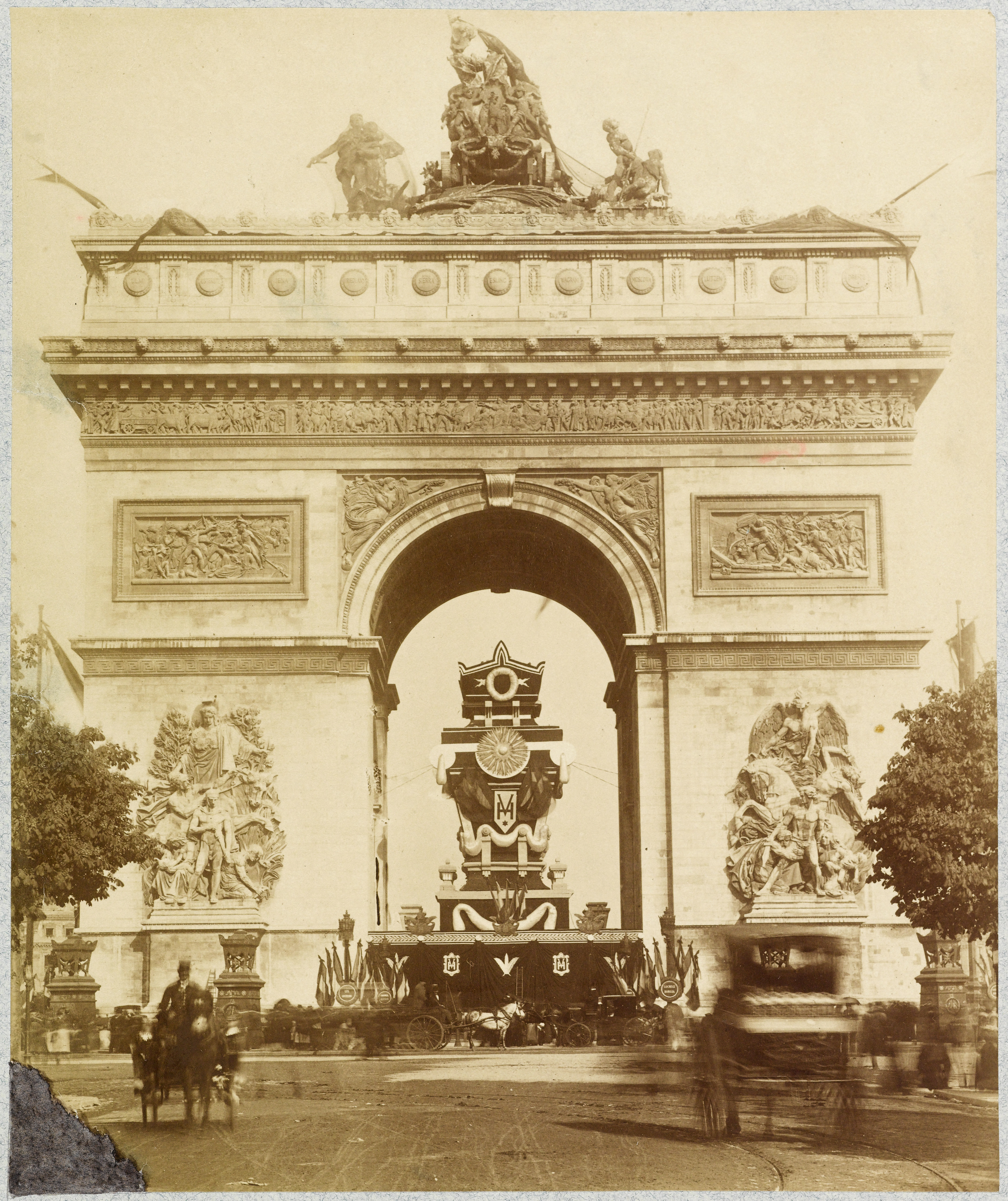
The Catafalque of Victor Hugo under the Arc de Triomphe on 1 June 1885

Hugo died on 22 May 1885, at 50 Avenue Victor Hugo (now number 124). His death, from pneumonia, generated intense national mourning. He was not only revered as a towering figure in literature, he was a statesman who shaped the Third Republic and democracy in France. All his life he remained a defender of liberty, equality and fraternity as well as an adamant champion of French culture. In 1877, aged 75, he wrote, "I am not one of these sweet-tempered old men. I am still exasperated and violent. I shout and I feel indignant and I cry. Woe to anyone who harms France! I do declare I will die a fanatic patriot."

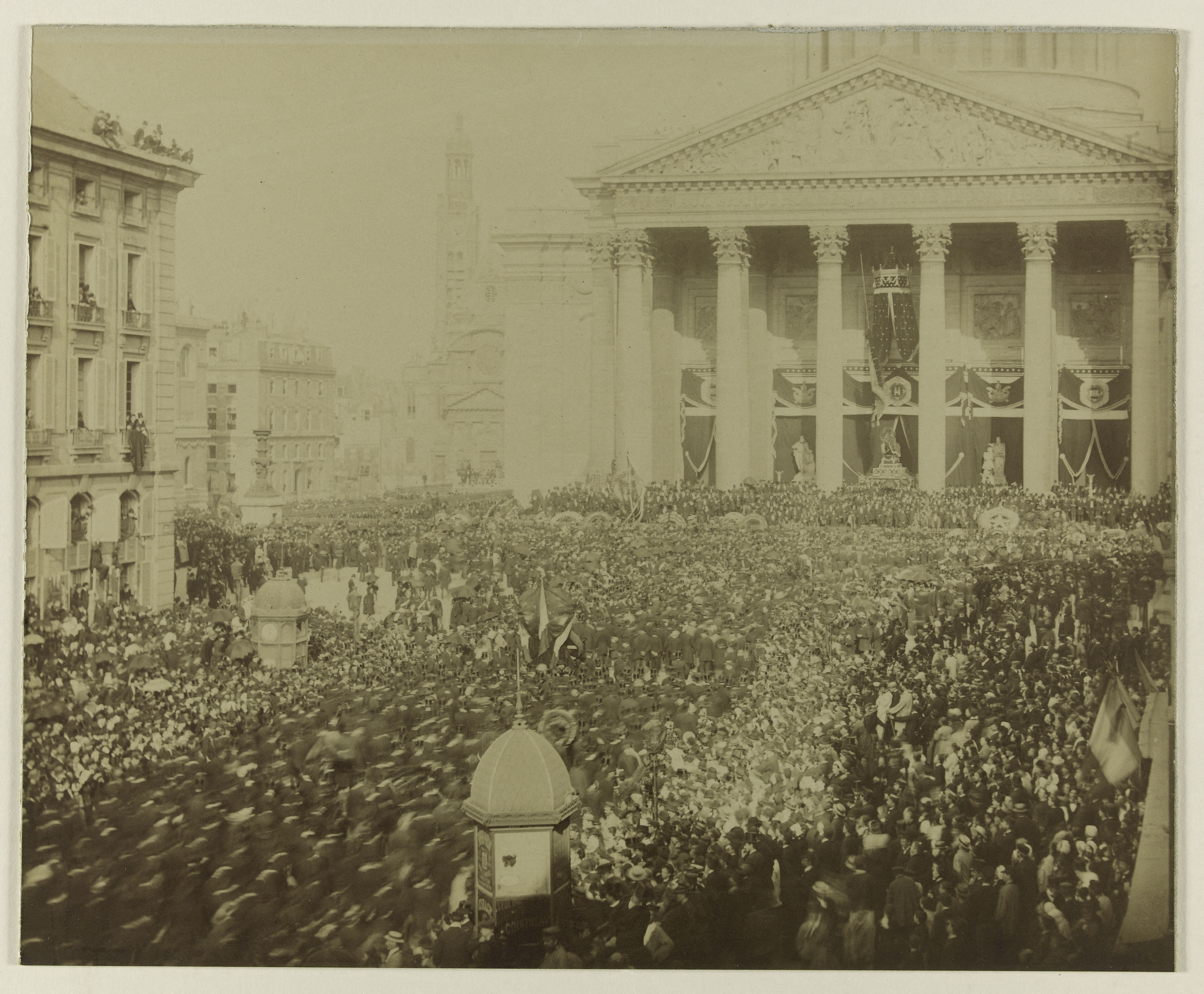
Crowd of mourners at the funeral, 1 June 1885.

Although he had requested a pauper's funeral, by decree of President Jules Grévy he was awarded a state funeral, an event described by Nietzsche as a "veritable orgy of bad taste". More than two million people joined Hugo's funeral procession in Paris from the Arc de Triomphe to the Panthéon, where he was buried. He shares a crypt within the Panthéon with Alexandre Dumas and Émile Zola. Most large French towns and cities have a street or square named after him.

Hugo left five sentences as his last will, to be officially published:

Je donne cinquante mille francs aux pauvres. Je veux être enterré dans leur corbillard.
Je refuse l'oraison de toutes les Églises. Je demande une prière à toutes les âmes.
Je crois en Dieu.

I leave 50,000 francs to the poor. I wish to be buried in their hearse.
I refuse [funeral] orations from all Churches. I ask [for] a prayer to all souls.
I believe in God.

== Drawings ==
Hugo produced more than 4,000 drawings, with about 3,000 drawings still in existence. Originally pursued as a casual hobby, drawing became more important to Hugo shortly before his exile when he made the decision to stop writing to devote himself to politics. Drawing became his exclusive creative outlet between 1848 and 1851.

Hugo worked only on paper, and on a small scale; usually in dark brown or black pen-and-ink wash, sometimes with touches of white, and rarely with colour.

== Personal life ==
=== Family ===
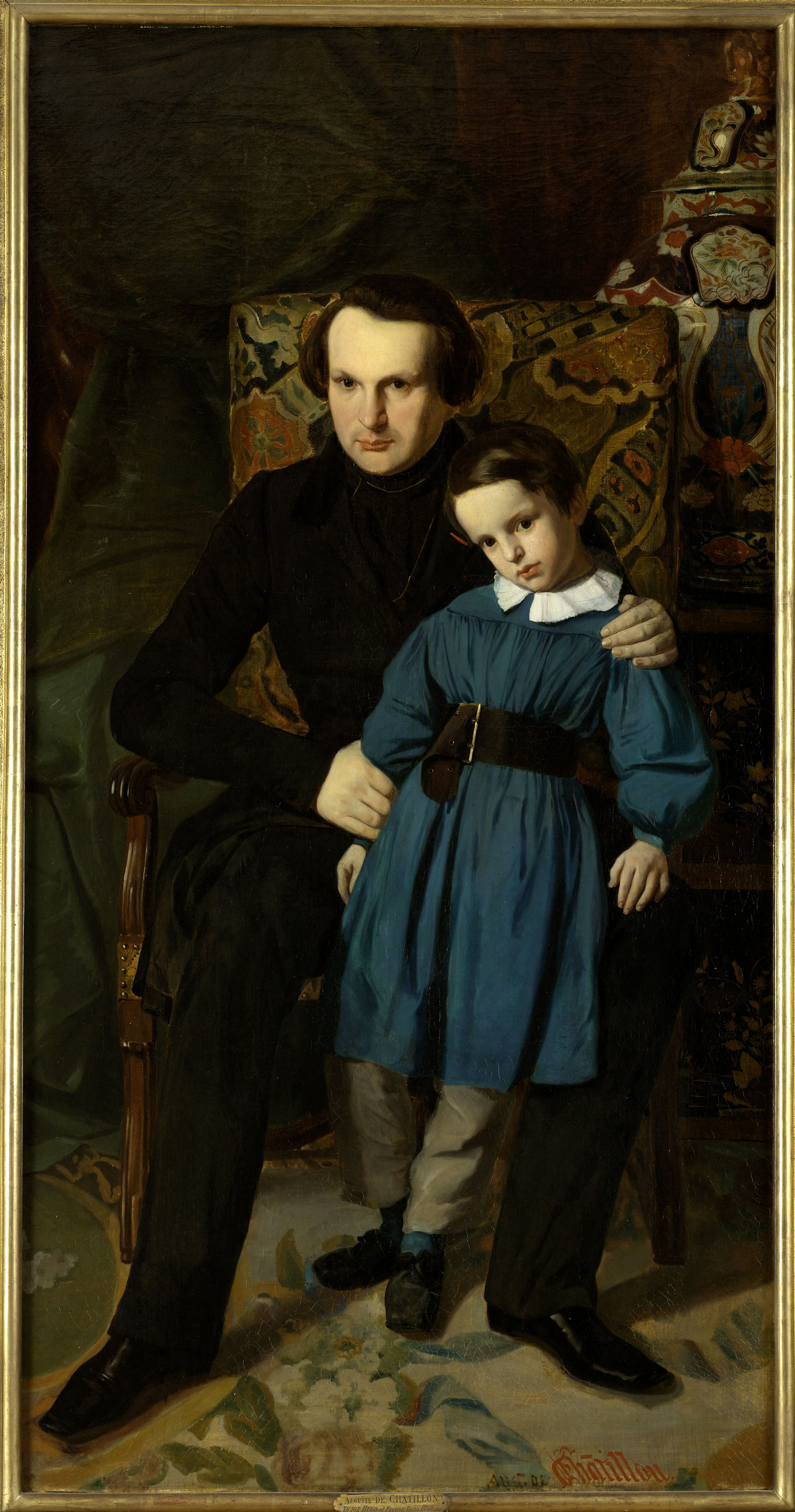
Victor Hugo with his son François-Victor by Auguste de Châtillon, 1836

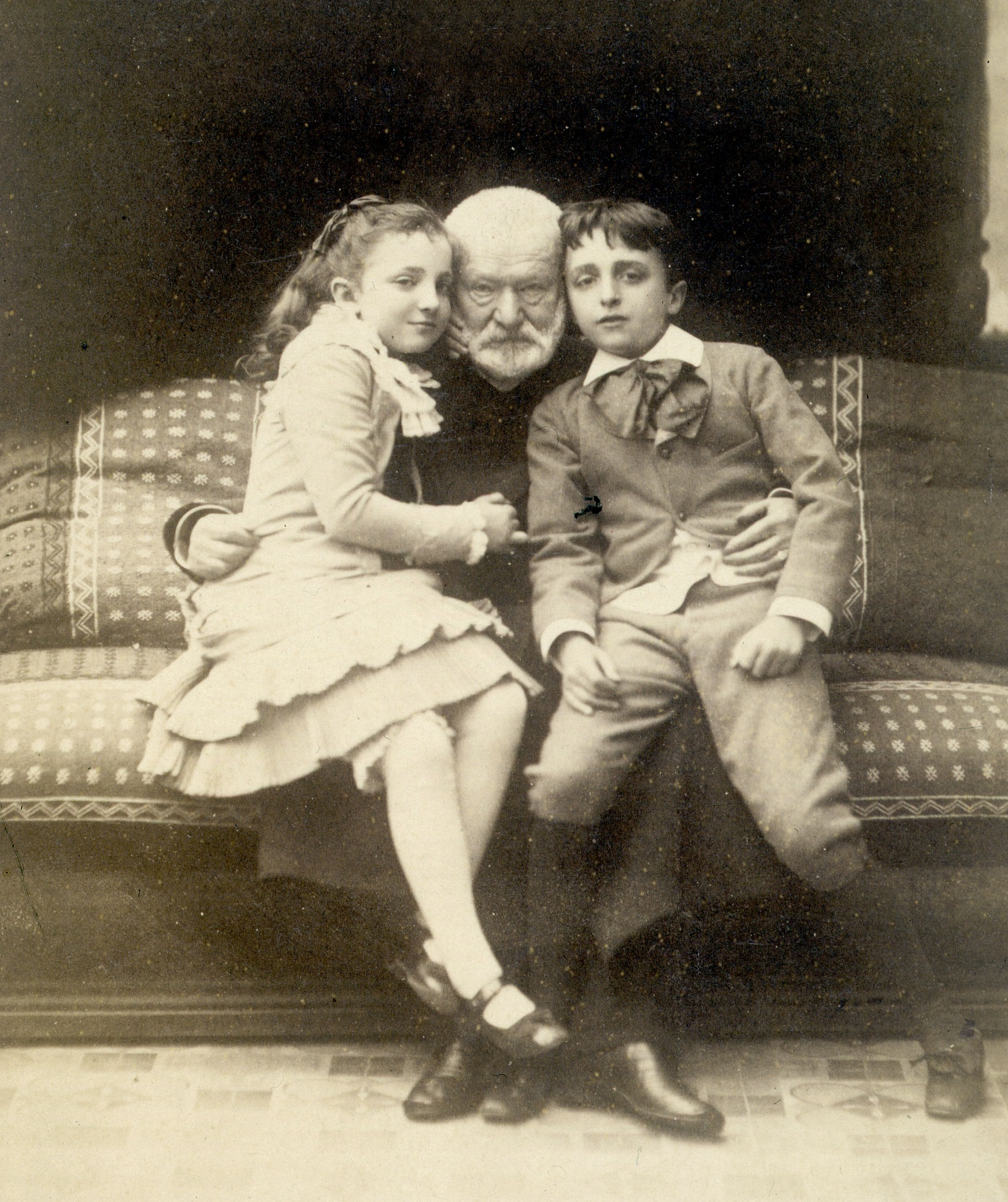
Hugo with his grandchildren Jeanne and Georges, 1881

==== Marriage ====
Hugo married Adèle Foucher in October 1822. Despite their respective affairs, they lived together for nearly 46 years until she died in August 1868. Hugo, who was still banished from France, was unable to attend her funeral in Villequier, where their daughter Léopoldine was buried. From 1830 to 1837, Adèle had an affair with Charles-Augustin Sainte Beuve, a reviewer and writer.

==== Children ====
Adèle and Victor Hugo had their first child, Léopold, in 1823, but the boy died in infancy. On 28 August 1824, the couple's second child, Léopoldine, was born, followed by Charles on 4 November 1826, François-Victor on 28 October 1828, and Adèle on 28 July 1830.

Hugo's eldest and favourite daughter, Léopoldine, died in 1843 at the age of 19, shortly after her marriage to Charles Vacquerie. On 4 September, she drowned in the Seine at Villequier when the boat she was in overturned. Her young husband died trying to save her. The death left her father devastated; Hugo was travelling at the time, in the south of France, when he first learned about Léopoldine's death from a newspaper that he read in a café.

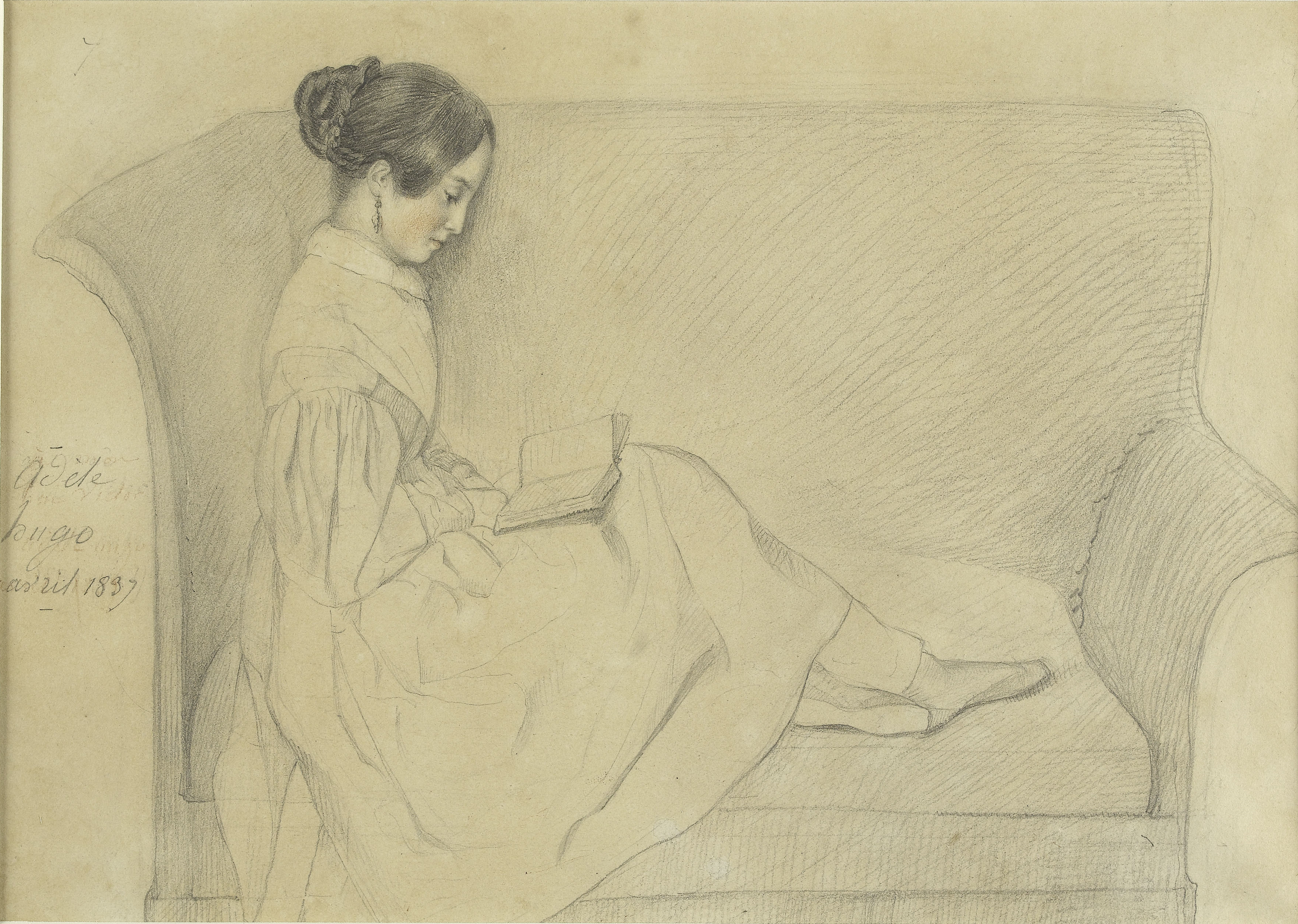
Léopoldine reading. Drawing by her mother Adèle Foucher, 1837

He describes his shock and grief in his poem "À Villequier":

Hélas ! vers le passé tournant un œil d'envie,
Sans que rien ici-bas puisse m'en consoler,
Je regarde toujours ce moment de ma vie
Où je l'ai vue ouvrir son aile et s'envoler!

Je verrai cet instant jusqu'à ce que je meure,
L'instant, pleurs superflus !
Où je criai : L'enfant que j'avais tout à l'heure,
Quoi donc ! je ne l'ai plus !

Translation:

Alas! My envious eye, turning toward the past,
Without anything else down here able to console me,
I look continually at that moment of my life
Where I saw her spread her wings and fly away!

I will see that instant until I die,
That instant, nothing beyond!
Where I cried: "The child I had a short time ago,
What! I have her no more!"

He wrote many poems afterward about his daughter's life and death. His most famous poem is "Demain, dès l'aube" (Tomorrow, at Dawn), in which he describes visiting her grave. Hugo ultimately outlived four of his five children, with the exception of his youngest, Adèle.

=== Exile ===
Hugo decided to live in exile after Napoleon III's coup d'état at the end of 1851. After leaving France, Hugo lived in Brussels briefly in 1851, and then moved to the Channel Islands, first to Jersey (1852–1855) and then to the smaller island of Guernsey in 1855, where he stayed until Napoleon III's fall from power in 1870. Although Napoleon III proclaimed a general amnesty in 1859, under which Hugo could have safely returned to France, the author stayed in exile, only returning when Napoleon III was removed from power by the creation of the French Third Republic in 1870, as a result of the French defeat at the Battle of Sedan in the Franco-Prussian War. After the Siege of Paris from 1870 to 1871, Hugo lived again in Guernsey from 1872 to 1873, and then finally returned to France for the remainder of his life. In 1871, after the death of his son Charles, Hugo took custody of his grandchildren Jeanne and Georges-Victor.

=== Other relationships ===
==== Juliette Drouet ====
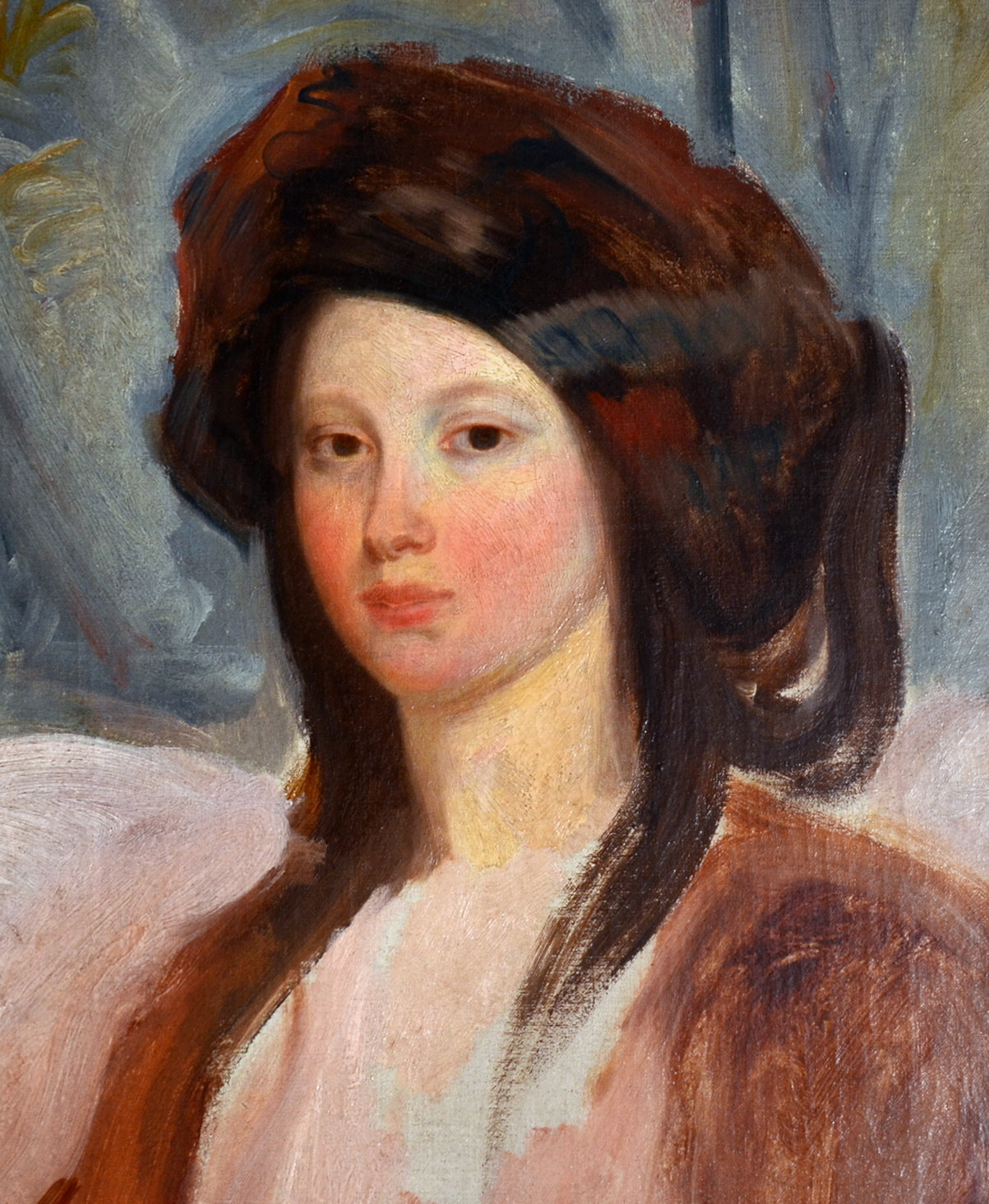
Juliette Drouet

From February 1833 until her death in 1883, Juliette Drouet devoted her whole life to Victor Hugo, who never married her even after his wife died in 1868. He took her on his numerous trips and she followed him in exile on Guernsey. There Hugo rented a house for her near Hauteville House, his family home. She wrote some 20,000 letters in which she expressed her passion or vented her jealousy on her womanizing lover. On 25 September 1870 during the Siege of Paris (19 September 1870 – 28 January 1871) Hugo feared the worst. He left his children a note reading as follows:

"J.D. She saved my life in December 1851. For me she underwent exile. Never has her soul forsaken mine. Let those who have loved me love her. Let those who have loved me respect her. She is my widow." V.H.

==== Léonie d'Aunet ====
For more than seven years, Léonie d'Aunet, who was married, was in a relationship with Hugo. Both were caught committing adultery on 5 July 1845. Hugo, who had been a Member of the Chamber of Peers since April, avoided a custodial sentence whereas his mistress had to spend two months in prison and six in a convent. Many years after their separation, Hugo supported her financially.

==== Others ====
Hugo had lovers until a few weeks before his death. He sought a wide variety of women of all ages, whether courtesans, actresses, prostitutes, admirers, servants or revolutionaries like Louise Michel for sex. He systematically reported his casual affairs using his own code, as Samuel Pepys did, to make sure they would remain secret. For instance, he resorted to Latin abbreviations (osc. for kisses) or to Spanish (Misma. Mismas cosas: The same. Same things). Homophones are frequent: Seins (Breasts) becomes Saint; Poële (Stove) actually refers to Poils (Pubic hair). Analogy also enabled him to conceal the real meaning: A woman's Suisses (Swiss) are her breasts—because Switzerland is renowned for its milk. After a rendezvous with a young woman named Laetitia he would write Joie (Happiness) in his diary. If he added t.n. (toute nue) he meant she stripped naked in front of him. The initials S.B. discovered in November 1875 may refer to Sarah Bernhardt.

== Nicknames ==
Victor Hugo acquired several nicknames. The first one originated from his own description of Shakespeare; in the introduction to his essay William Shakespeare, he tried to delve into what constituted the genius of certain artists and described Shakespeare as an Homme Océan ("Ocean Man"):

There were indeed ocean men.
[...] all of this could exist within a mind, and then that mind is called genius, and you have Aeschylus, you have Isaiah, you have Juvenal, you have Dante, you have Michelangelo, you have Shakespeare, and it is the same thing to gaze upon these souls or to gaze upon the Ocean.

During his lifetime and in the 1870s, the expression to describe him entered popular culture. It was later adopted by authors and literary critics, including Joseph Serre, who identified it with an expression he himself coined. This nickname became widespread during the 20th century and was used by the National Library of France when organizing an exhibition about him. Since then, it has been frequently used in research and literary critics. Alongside "Ocean Man," the nickname "Horizon Man" was sometimes used during Hugo's life. In the end researchers and literary critics, such as Henri Meschonnic, suggest the "Century Man" nickname to refer to Hugo.

== Memorials ==
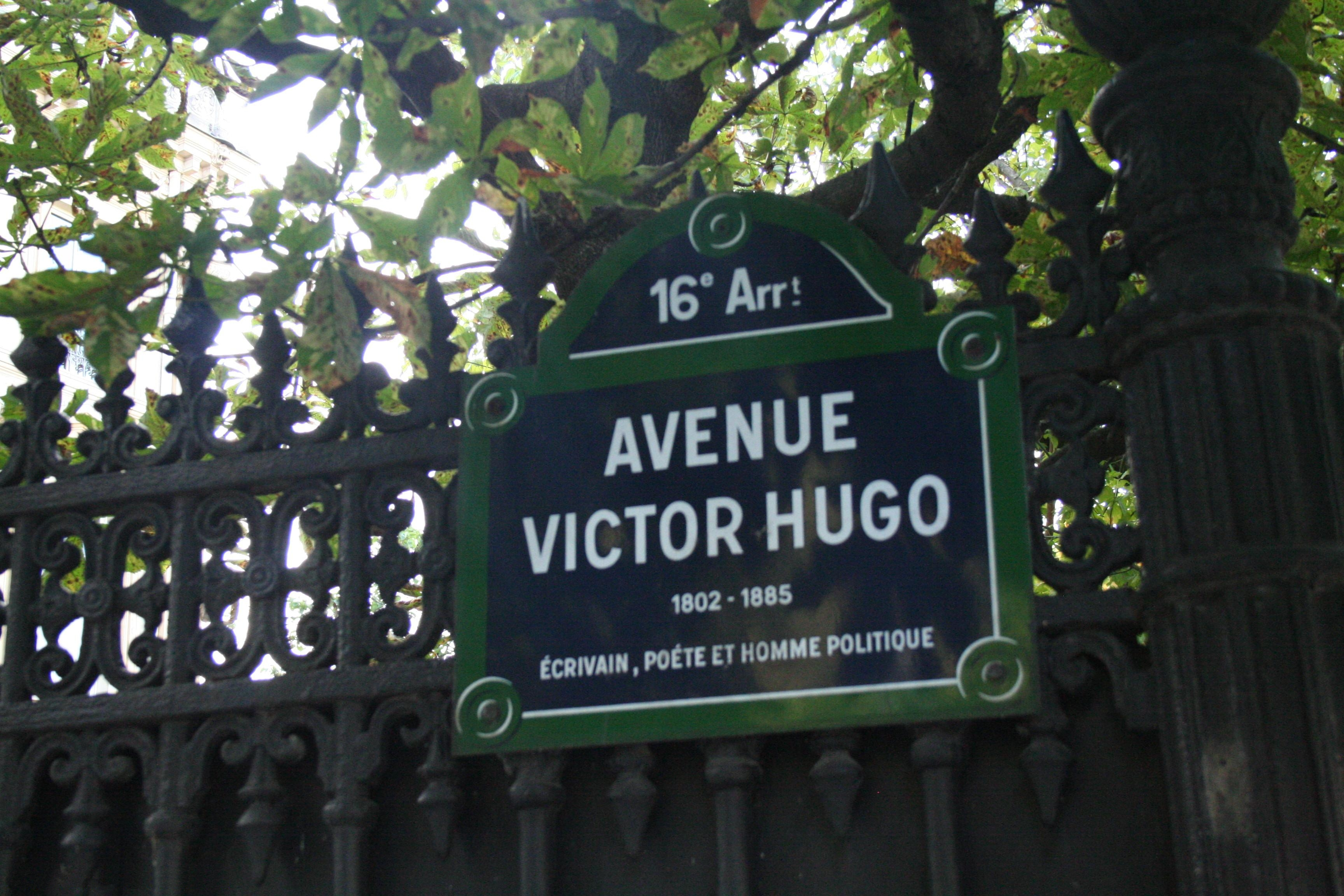
Avenue Victor-Hugo in Paris.

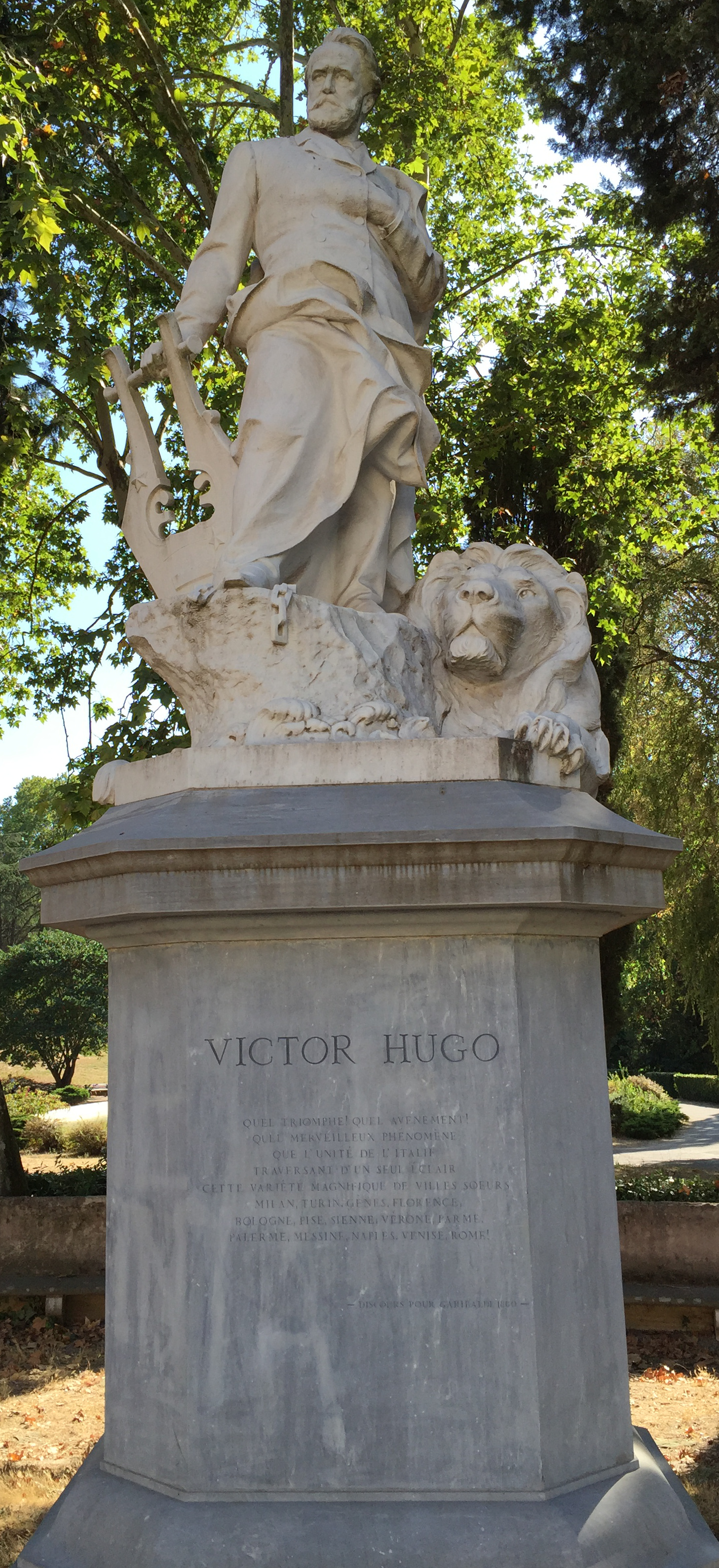
Statue of Victor Hugo in Rome, Italy. It is across from the Museo Carlo Bilotti on Viale Fiorello La Guardia.

His legacy has been honored in many ways, including his portrait being placed on French currency.

The people of Guernsey erected a statue by sculptor Jean Boucher in Candie Gardens (Saint Peter Port) to commemorate his stay in the islands. The City of Paris has preserved his residences Hauteville House, Guernsey, and 6, Place des Vosges, Paris, as museums. The house where he stayed in Vianden, Luxembourg, in 1871 has also become a museum.

The Avenue Victor-Hugo in the 16th arrondissement of Paris bears Hugo's name and links the Place de l'Étoile to the vicinity of the Bois de Boulogne by way of the Place Victor-Hugo. This square is served by a Paris Metro stop also named in his honour. In the town of Béziers there is a main street, a school, hospital and several cafés named after Hugo, and a number of streets and avenues throughout France are named after him. The Lycée Victor Hugo school was founded in his town of birth, Besançon in France. Avenue Victor-Hugo, located in Shawinigan, Quebec, was named in honour of him. A street in San Francisco, Hugo Street, is named after him.

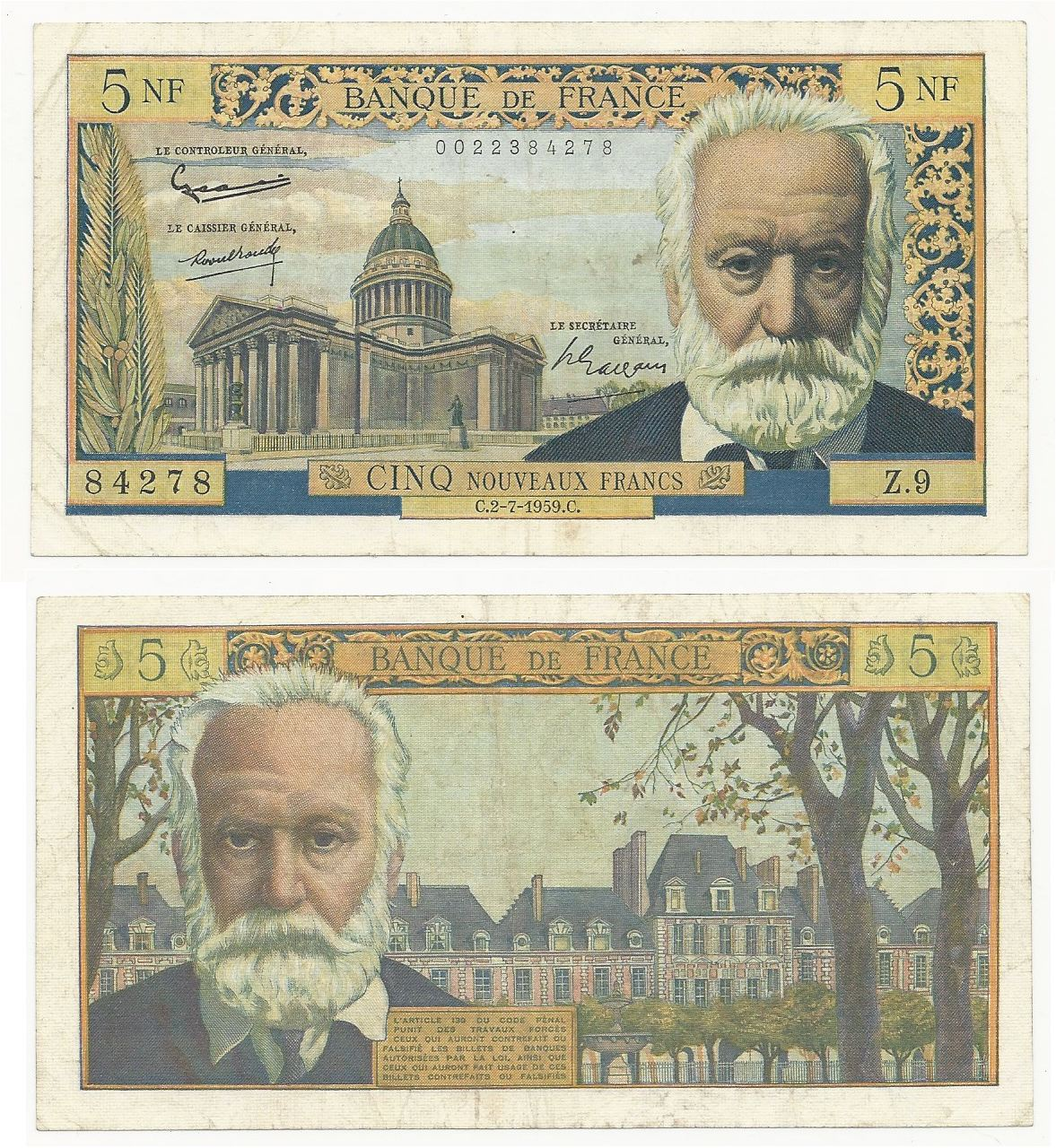
A 1959 French banknote featuring Hugo

In the city of Avellino, Italy, Victor Hugo briefly stayed in what is now known as Il Palazzo Culturale when reuniting with his father, Leopold Sigisbert Hugo, in 1808. Hugo would later write about his brief stay here, quoting "C'était un palais de marbre..." ("It was a palace of marble").

There is a statue of Hugo across from the Museo Carlo Bilotti in Rome, Italy.

Victor Hugo is the namesake of the city of Hugoton, Kansas. Hugo, MN boasts Victor Hugo Blvd, Victor Square park, Victor Gardens, Victor path, and Victor Hugo Clocktower. In Havana, Cuba, there is a park named after him.

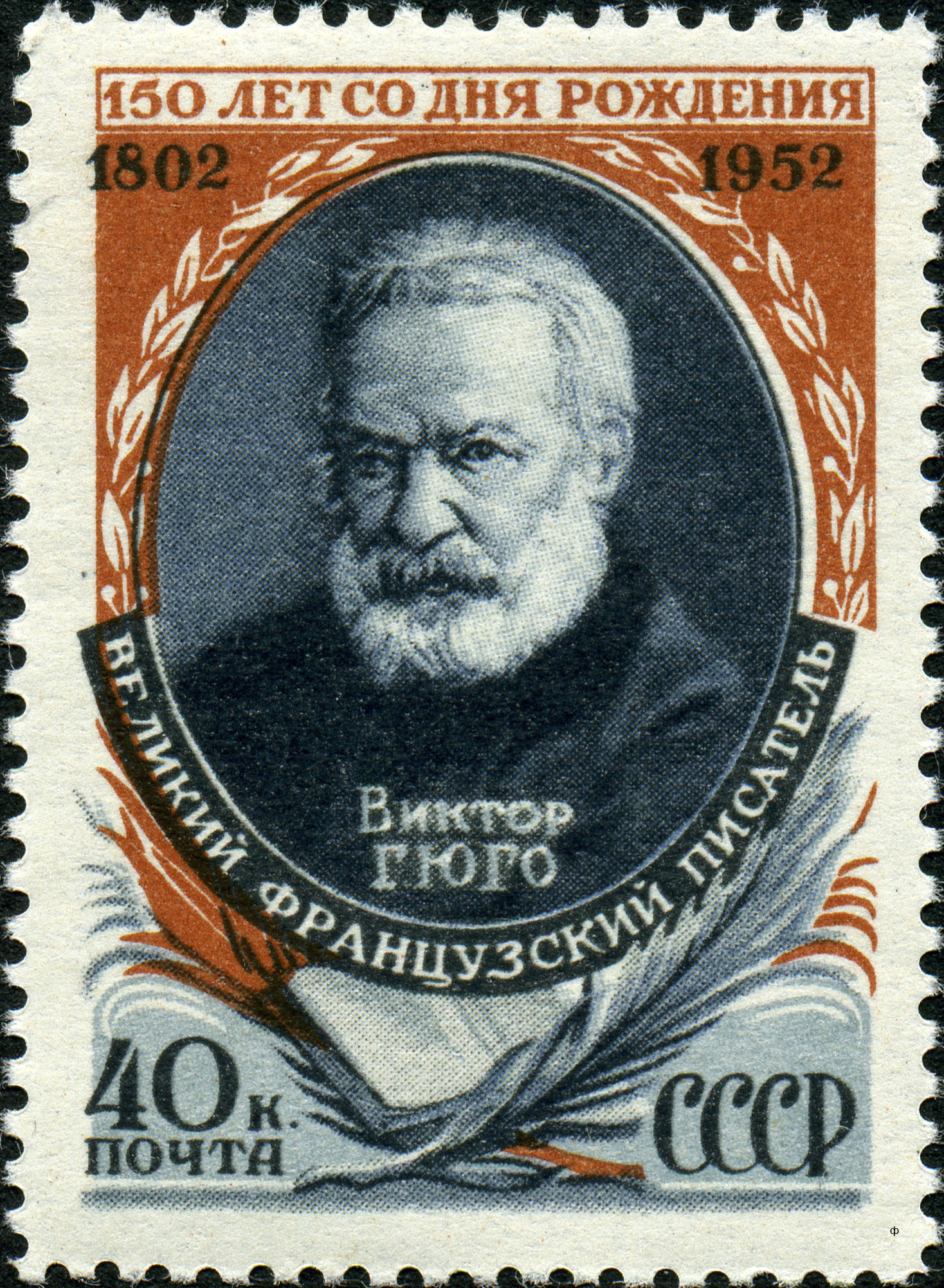
1952 Soviet stamp in Hugo's honour

A bust of Hugo stands near the entrance of the Old Summer Palace in Beijing marking his criticism of its destruction by Anglo-French forces during the Second Opium War.

A mosaic commemorating Hugo is located on the ceiling of the Thomas Jefferson Building of the Library of Congress.

The London and North Western Railway named a 'Prince of Wales' Class 4-6-0 No 1134 after Hugo. British Railways perpetuated this memorial, naming Class 92 Electric Unit 92001 after him.

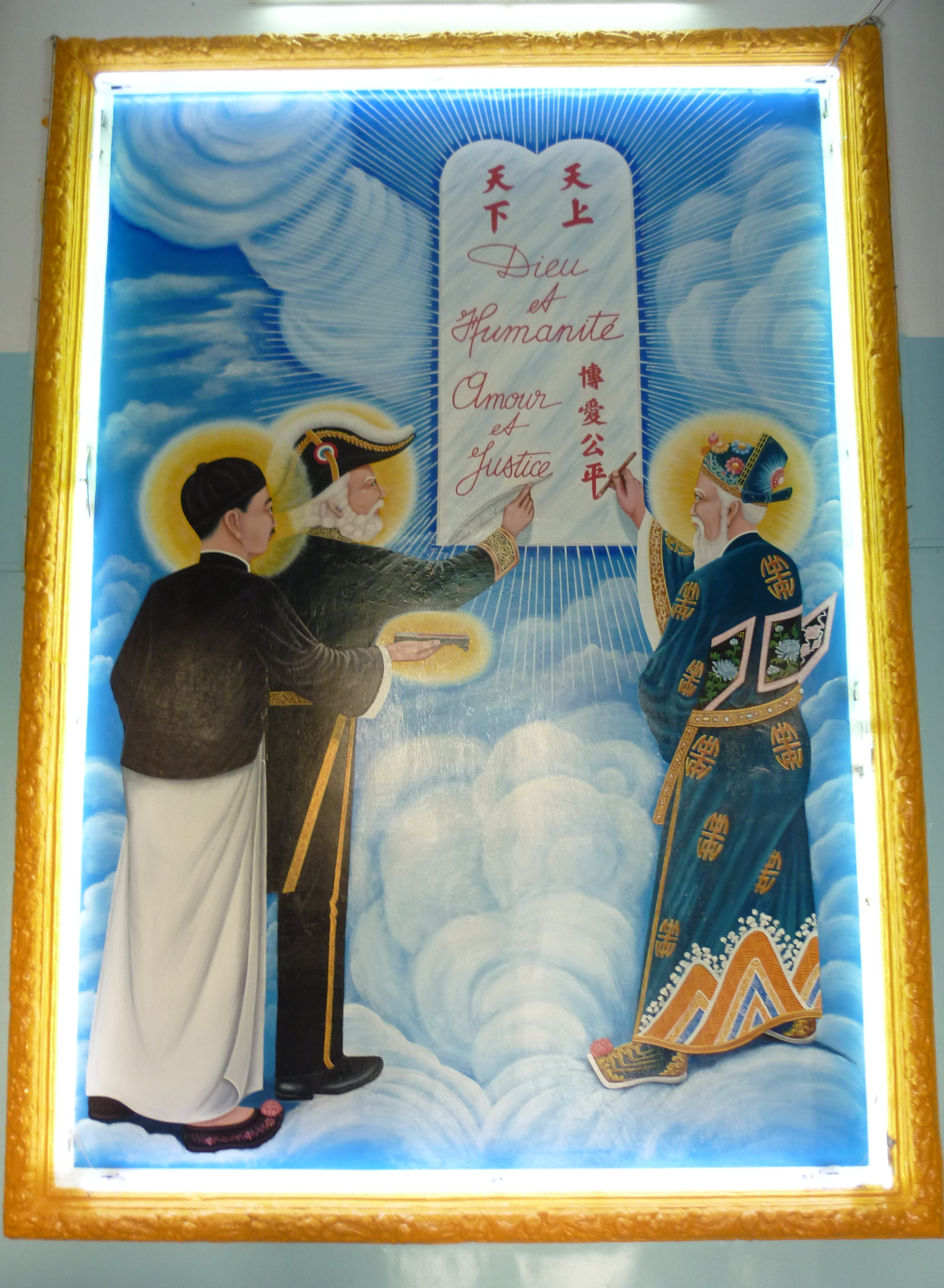
Victor Hugo, along with Sun Yat-Sen and Nguyễn Bỉnh Khiêm, is venerated in Caodaism

Hugo is venerated as a saint in the religion of Caodaism, which was founded in Vietnam in 1926.

A crater on the planet Mercury is named after him.

== Works ==
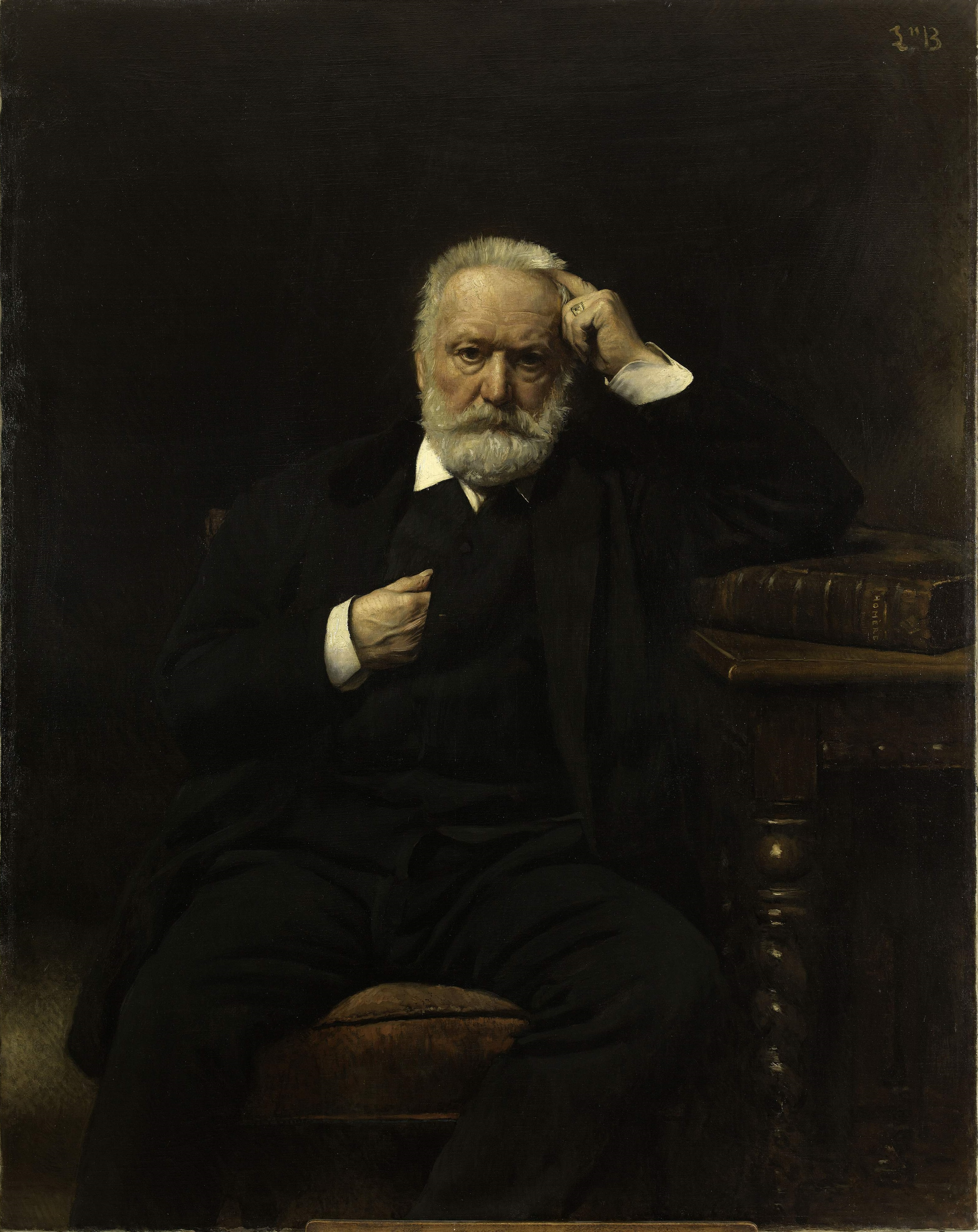
Portrait of Victor Hugo by Léon Bonnat, 1879

=== Prose fiction ===
- Hans of Iceland (Han d'Islande – novella - 1820, novel - 1823, revised until 1833)
- Bug-Jargal (short story – 1820, novel – 1826)
- The Last Day of a Condemned Man (Le Dernier jour d'un condamné – 1829) - first prototype for Les Misérables
- The Hunchback of Notre-Dame (Notre-Dame de Paris – 1831, definitive unabridged edition: 1832)
  - La Esmeralda (the only libretto of an opera written by Victor Hugo himself) (1836) – the ending was altered for the play
- Claude Gueux (1834) - second prototype for Les Misérables
- The Rhine (Le Rhin – 1842) - also contains essays and a political manifesto
- The Poor People (1854) - short story included in La Légende des siècles, later rewritten or retold by Leo Tolstoy in Russian (1908)
- Les Misérables (1862) - mega-novel, initially begun as Les Misères. 7 chapters from Book 7 of Part 3 were excised by Albert Lacroix at the time of publication. None of the English translations include the excised chapters but some French editions include them as Appendix or in Notes.
  - Les Misères (1845–48) - two draft versions of Les Misérables - not yet translated into English but available online in French
- Toilers of the Sea (Les Travailleurs de la Mer – 1866)
- The Man Who Laughs ( L'Homme qui rit – 1869)
- Ninety-Three (Quatrevingt-treize – 1874)

=== Other works published during Hugo's lifetime ===
- Odes et poésies diverses (1822)
- Odes (1823)
- Nouvelles Odes (1824)
- Odes et Ballades (1826)
- Cromwell, with Preface (1827)
- Les Orientales (1829)
- Hernani (1830)
- Marion de Lorme (1831)
- Les Feuilles d'automne (Autumn Leaves; 1831)
- Le roi s'amuse (1832)
- Lucrezia Borgia (1833)
- Marie Tudor (1833)
- Littérature et philosophie mêlées (A Blend of Literature and Philosophy; 1834)
- Angelo, Tyrant of Padua (1835)
- Les Chants du crépuscule (Songs of the Half Light; 1835)
- Les Voix intérieures (1837)
- Ruy Blas (1838)
- Les Rayons et les Ombres (1840)
- Les Burgraves (1843)
- Napoléon le Petit (Napoleon the Little; 1852)
- Les Châtiments (1853)
- Les Contemplations (The Contemplations; 1856)
- La Légende des siècles (The Legend of the Ages; 1859)
- William Shakespeare (1864)
- Les Chansons des rues et des bois (Songs of Street and Wood; 1865)
- La voix de Guernsey (1867)
- L'Année terrible (1872)
- Mes Fils (1874)
- Actes et paroles – Avant l'exil (1875)
- Actes et paroles – Pendant l'exil (Deeds and Words; 1875)
- Actes et paroles – Depuis l'exil (1876)
- La Légende des Siècles 2e série (1877)
- L'Art d'être grand-père (The Art of Being a Grandfather; 1877)
- Histoire d'un crime 1re partie (History of a Crime; 1877)
- Histoire d'un crime 2e partie (1878)
- Le Pape (1878)
- La Pitié suprême (1879)
- Religions et religion (Religions and Religion; 1880)
- L'Âne (1880)
- Les Quatre vents de l'esprit (The Four Winds of the Spirit; 1881)
- Torquemada (1882)
- La Légende des siècles Tome III (1883)
- L'Archipel de la Manche (1883)
- Poems of Victor Hugo
- Battle of Hernani

=== Published posthumously ===
- Théâtre en liberté (1886)
- La Fin de Satan (1886)
- Choses vues (1887)
- Toute la Lyre (1888), (The Whole Lyre)
- Amy Robsart (1889)
- Les Jumeaux (1889)
- Actes et Paroles – Depuis l'exil, 1876–1885 (1889)
- Alpes et Pyrénées (1890), (Alps and Pyrenees)
- Dieu (1891)
- France et Belgique (1892)
- Toute la lyre – dernière série (1893)
- Les fromages (1895)
- Correspondences – Tome I (1896)
- Correspondences – Tome II (1898)
- Les années funestes (1898)
- Choses vues – nouvelle série (1900)
- Post-scriptum de ma vie (1901)
- Dernière Gerbe (1902)
- Mille francs de récompense (1934)
- Océan. Tas de pierres (1942)
- L'Intervention (1951)
- Conversations with Eternity (1998)

== Sources ==
- Escholier, Raymond (1932). Victor Hugo raconté par ceux qui l'ont vu: Souvenirs, lettres, documents réunis, annotés et accompagnés de résumés biographiques. Les grands hommes racontés par ceux qui les ont vus - Figures vivantes (in French). FeniXX réédition numérique.
- Hugo, V.; American Anti-Slavery Society (1860). Letters on American Slavery from Victor Hugo, de Tocqueville, Emile de Girardin, Carnot, Passy, Mazzini, Humboldt, O. Lafayette—etc. HeinOnline: Slavery in America and the world: history, culture & law. American Anti-Slavery Society.
- Herrington, E. (2005). The Afterlife of John Brown. Palgrave Macmillan US. ISBN 978-1-4039-7846-2.
- Langellier, J.P. (2014). Dictionnaire Victor Hugo. Dictionnaires-Atlas-Encyclopédies (in French). Place des éditeurs. ISBN 978-2-262-04938-6.
- l'Esclavage, Mémoires des abolitions de. "History". Road of Abolitions.
- Vincenzo Vicenti (1998). Arcangela Vicenti e Giuseppe Pupillo (ed.). Medaglioni altamurani del 1799. Cassano delle Murge: Messaggi. pp. 45–46. Archived from the original on 18 July 2021.
