= Conversations with Eternity =

- Author: John Chambers

Conversations with Eternity is a book by John Chambers, published from a series of notes by Victor Hugo. It "set out to present the Hugo family's table-turning seances in Marine-Terrace on the island of Jersey between 1853 and 1855". Chambers translated the original notes, which dealt with themes of spirituality.
