= 2020 Seine-Maritime's 5th constituency by-election =

By-election for Seine-Maritime's 5th constituency of the French National Assembly

← 2017	20 September 2020 (first round); 27 September 2020 (second round)	2022 →
- Turnout: 17.71% (first round); 17.75% (second round)
Nominee	Gérard Leseul	Jean-Cyril Montier	Patricia Lhoir
Party	PS	RN	LREM
Running mate	Martine Blondel	Anaïs Thomas	Paul Bonmartel
1st round %	6,586; 39.94% ▼1.92%	2970; 18.01%▼0.81%	1,767; 10.72%
2nd round %	11,502; 71.61% ▲2.46	4,561; 28.39%
Deputy before election
Bastien Coriton
PS
Elected deputy
Gérard Leseul
PS

A by-election for Seine-Maritime's 5th constituency was held in September 2020. Politically the seat has remained a solid bastion for the Socialist Party. In 2017 the seat was a rare example of them retaining a seat.

The deputy, Christophe Bouillon was elected mayor of Barentin on 28 May 2020 and resigned from the National Assembly on 18 June because of cumulation of mandates. His substitute, Bastien Coriton, was also elected mayor, in Rives-en-Seine, so resigned from the assembly five days after taking office. A by-election was called for 20 and 27 September 2020.

Gérard Leseul of the socialists was elected in the second round.

== By-election result ==
2020 by-election: Seine-Maritime's 5th constituency
Party	Candidate	Votes	%	±%
PS	Gérard Leseul (Substitute: Martine Blondel)	6,586	39.94	−1.92
RN	Jean-Cyril Montier (Substitute: Anaïs Thomas)	2,970	18.01	−0.81
LREM	Patricia Lhoir (Substitute: Paul Bonmartel)	1,767	10.72	N/A
LR	Michel Allais (Substitute: Corinne Buquet)	1,601	9.71	−11.41
G.s	Auban Al Jiboury (Substitute: Enora Chopard)	1,455	8.82	N/A
LFI	Maxime Da Silva (Substitute: Marie-Odile Lecourtois)	1,434	8.70	−3.06
Far left	Valérie Foissey (Substitute: Frédéric Podguzer)	391	2.37	N/A
Others	N/A	286		
Turnout		16,918	17.71	−31.37
2nd round result
PS	Gérard Leseul (Substitute: Martine Blondel)	11,502	71.61	+2.46
RN	Jean-Cyril Montier (Substitute: Anaïs Thomas)	4,561	28.39	N/A
Turnout		16,961	17.75	−24.29
PS hold				
