= Seine-Maritime's 5th constituency =

Constituency of the National Assembly of France

5th constituency of Seine-Maritime
- inline Constituency of the National Assembly of France

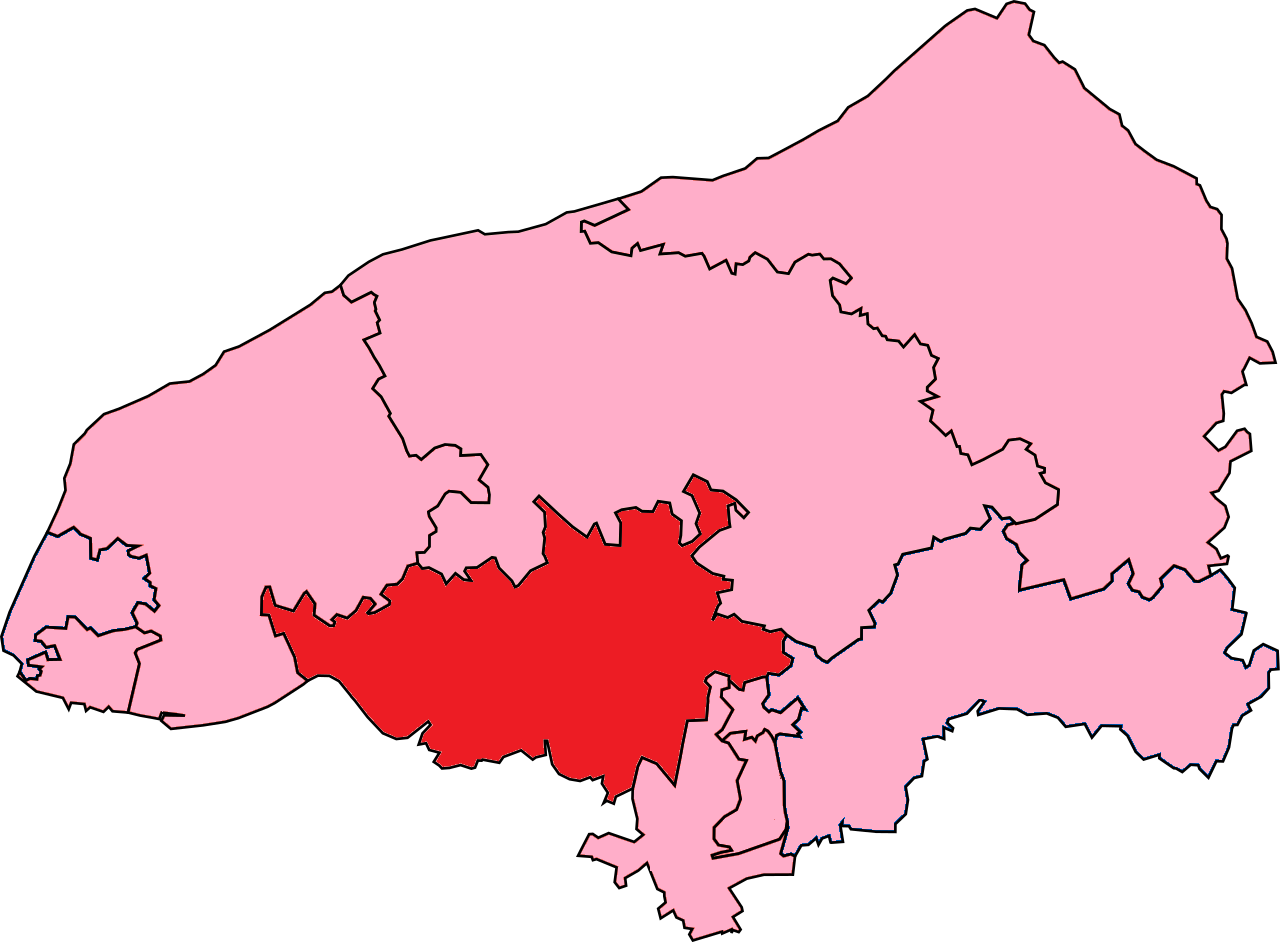
- Seine-Maritime's 5th Constituency shown within Seine-Maritime
- Deputy: Gérard Leseul; PS
- Department: Seine-Maritime
- Cantons: Caudebec-en-Caux, Duclair, Lillebonne, Notre-Dame-de-Bondeville, Pavilly
- Registered voters: 96317

The 5th constituency of the Seine-Maritime (French: Cinquième circonscription de la Seine-Maritime) is a French legislative constituency in the Seine-Maritime département. Like the other 576 French constituencies, it elects one MP using the two-round system, with a run-off if no candidate receives over 50% of the vote in the first round.

== Description ==
The 5th Constituency of the Seine-Maritime covers a large central area in the southern part of the department to the west of Rouen. The seat adjoins the city as it includes the suburb of Notre-Dame-de-Bondeville, it does however also include a large swathe of the Boucles of the Seine Regional Natural Park.

Politically the seat has remained a solid bastion for the Socialist Party. In 2017 the seat was a rare example of them retaining a seat.

Christophe Bouillon was elected mayor of Barentin on 28 May 2020 and resigned on 18 June for multiple mandates. His substitute, Bastien Coriton, also elected mayor in Rives-en-Seine, resigned five days after taking office. A by-election was held on 20 and 27 September 2020.

== Deputies ==
Election	Member	Party	Notes
1958	André Bettencourt	CNIP	
1962	André Bettencourt	RI	
1966	Georges Chedru	RI	
1967	André Bettencourt	RI	
1967	Georges Chedru	RI	
1968	André Bettencourt	RI	
1968	Georges Chedru	RI	
1973	André Bettencourt	RI	
1978	Charles Revet	UDF	
1981	Paul Dhaille	PS	
1986	Proportional representation – no election by constituency		
1988	Jean-Claude Bateux	PS	
1993	Jean-Claude Bateux	PS	
1997	Jean-Claude Bateux	PS	
2002	Jean-Claude Bateux	PS	
2007	Christophe Bouillon	PS	
2012	Christophe Bouillon	PS	
2017	Christophe Bouillon	PS	Elected mayor of Barentin on 28 May 2020 and resigned from the National Assembly on 18 June because of cumulation of mandates
2020	Bastien Coriton	PS	Substitute for Bouillon, elected mayor of Rives-en-Seine, resigned from National Assembly after 5 days
2020	Gérard Leseul	PS	
2022	Gérard Leseul	PS	

== Election results ==
=== 2024 ===
Legislative Election 2024: Seine-Maritime's 5th constituency
Party	Candidate	Votes	%	±%
PS (NFP)	Gérard Leseul	26,406	41.40	+7.73
RN	Jean-Cyril Montier	21,281	33.36	+5.30
HOR (Ensemble)	Jean Dalalandre	14,259	22.35	−3.46
LO	Simon Sulkowski	963	1.51	−0.40
REC	Jean-Marc Bled	880	1.38	−1.82
Turnout		63,789	97.67	+48.50
Registered electors		94,874		
2nd round result
PS	Gérard Leseul	31,994	51.68	−4.13
RN	Jean-Cyril Montier	29,908	48.32	+4.13
Turnout		61,902	94.32	+46.77
Registered electors		94,907		
PS hold		Swing		

=== 2022 ===
Legislative Election 2022: Seine-Maritime's 5th constituency
Party	Candidate	Votes	%	±%
PS (NUPÉS)	Gérard Leseul	15,440	33.67	-23.67
RN	Jean-Cyirl Montier	12,867	28.06	+10.05
HOR (Ensemble)	Jean Delalandre	11,835	25.81	+15.09
LR (UDC)	Eddy Lefaux	2,266	4.94	−4.77
REC	Frédéric Mazier	1,468	3.20	N/A
PA	Alain Guillotte	1,098	2.39	N/A
LO	Simon Sulkowski	877	1.91	N/A
Turnout		46,792	49.17	+31.46
2nd round result
PS (NUPÉS)	Gérard Leseul	22,874	55.81	-15.80
RN	Jean-Cyirl Montier	18,113	44.19	+15.80
Turnout		40,987	47.55	+29.80
PS hold				

=== 2020 by-election ===
2020 by-election: Seine-Maritime's 5th constituency
Party	Candidate	Votes	%	±%
PS	Gérard Leseul	6,586	39.94	−1.92
RN	Jean-Cyril Montier	2,970	18.01	−0.81
LREM	Patricia Lhoir	1,767	10.72	N/A
LR	Michel Allais	1,601	9.71	−11.41
G.s	Auban Al Jiboury	1,455	8.82	N/A
LFI	Maxime Da Silva	1,434	8.70	−3.06
Far left	Valérie Foissey	391	2.37	N/A
Others	N/A	286		
Turnout		16,918	17.71	−31.37
2nd round result
PS	Gérard Leseul	11,502	71.61	+2.46
RN	Jean-Cyril Montier	4,561	28.39	N/A
Turnout		16,961	17.75	−24.29
PS hold				

=== 2017 ===
Legislative Election 2017: Seine-Maritime's 5th constituency
Party	Candidate	Votes	%	±%
PS	Christophe Bouillon	19,230	41.86	−7.57
LR	Jean Delalandre	9,702	21.12	+0.63
FN	Bénédicte Le Moel	8,647	18.82	+3.19
LFI	Myriam Mulot	5,403	11.76	N/A
EELV	Christophe Manchon	1,774	3.86	+1.20
Others	N/A	1,183		
Turnout		47,271	49.08	−8.25
2nd round result
PS	Christophe Bouillon	26,103	69.15	+3.05
LR	Jean Delalandre	11,648	30.85	−3.05
Turnout		40,496	42.04	−11.10
PS hold		Swing		

=== 2012 ===
Legislative Election 2012: Seine-Maritime's 5th constituency
Party	Candidate	Votes	%	±%
PS	Christophe Bouillon	26,713	49.43	+9.14
UMP	Valérie Karmere-Loisel	11,075	20.49	−13.14
FN	Thimothée Houssin	8,448	15.63	+11.13
FG	Valérie Lebrun	2,951	5.46	−0.35
NM	Moise Moreira	1,474	2.73	N/A
EELV	Marie-France Persil	1,438	2.66	+0.35
Others	N/A	1,948		
Turnout		54,047	57.33	−4.95
2nd round result
PS	Christophe Bouillon	33,118	66.10	+6.04
UMP	Valérie Karmere-Loisel	16,984	33.90	−6.04
Turnout		50,102	53.14	−8.36
PS hold				

=== 2007 ===
Legislative Election 2007: Seine-Maritime's 5th constituency
Party	Candidate	Votes	%	±%
PS	Christophe Bouillon	21,943	40.29	+3.15
UMP	Marie-Agnès Poussier	18,315	33.63	+6.75
MoDem	Samia Boukhalfa	3,367	6.18	N/A
PCF	Boris Lecoeur	3,165	5.81	−1.34
FN	Marie-Claude Joly	2,448	4.50	−6.27
LV	Claire Lutz	1,256	2.31	−1.23
Far left	Aldo Cascella	1,162	2.13	N/A
Others	N/A	2,800		
Turnout		55,473	62.28	−2.10
2nd round result
PS	Christophe Bouillon	32,196	60.06	+2.02
UMP	Marie-Agnès Poussier	21,411	39.94	−2.02
Turnout		54,779	61.50	+0.54
PS hold				

=== 2002 ===
Legislative Election 2002: Seine-Maritime's 5th constituency
Party	Candidate	Votes	%	±%
PS	Jean-Claude Bateux	19,985	37.14	+0.15
UMP	Sylvain Bulard	14,463	26.88	N/A
FN	Monique Yvelain	5,794	10.77	−4.48
PCF	Boris Lecoeur	3,847	7.15	−6.64
DVD	Daniel Laboure	2,122	3.94	N/A
LV	Arnaud Saint Jores De	1,905	3.54	+0.47
LCR	Frank Prouhet	1,179	2.19	N/A
CPNT	Nicole Bachelet	1,142	2.12	N/A
Others	N/A	3,373		
Turnout		54,985	64.38	−7.02
2nd round result
PS	Jean-Claude Bateux	29,078	58.04	−7.24
UMP	Sylvain Bulard	21,025	41.96	N/A
Turnout		52,054	60.96	−11.96
PS hold				

=== 1997 ===
Legislative Election 1997: Seine-Maritime's 5th constituency
Party	Candidate	Votes	%	±%
PS	Jean-Claude Bateux	20,610	36.99	
UDF	Philippe Grigny	11,318	20.31	
FN	François-Thibaud Lamy	8,494	15.25	
PCF	Colette Privat	7,682	13.79	
GE	Gilles Fauconnier	1,996	3.58	
LV	Marc Teani	1,712	3.07	
LO	Alain Rivière	1,470	2.64	
DVD	Jean-Paul Delafenêtre	1,169	2.10	
Others	N/A	1,262		
Turnout		58,504	71.40	
2nd round result
PS	Jean-Claude Bateux	36,651	65.28	
UDF	Philippe Grigny	19,492	34.72	
Turnout		59,728	72.92	
PS hold				
