= Bastien Coriton =

French politician

Member of the National Assembly for Seine-Maritime's 5th constituency
- In office 18 June 2020 – 23 June 2020
- Preceded by: Christophe Bouillon
- Succeeded by: Gérard Leseul

Personal details
- Born: 12 October 1981 (age 44) France
- Party: Socialist Party

Bastien Coriton (born 12 September 1981) is a French politician who briefly served as a Member of Parliament in 2020.

== Career ==
As the substitute candidate in the 2017 legislative election, he took the seat of Christophe Bouillon.

He was elected mayor of Rives-en-Seine and, due to the dual mandate, resigned from the National Assembly after 5 days, triggering a by-election.
