= Demain dès l'aube =

Poem by Victor Hugo

- by Victor Hugo
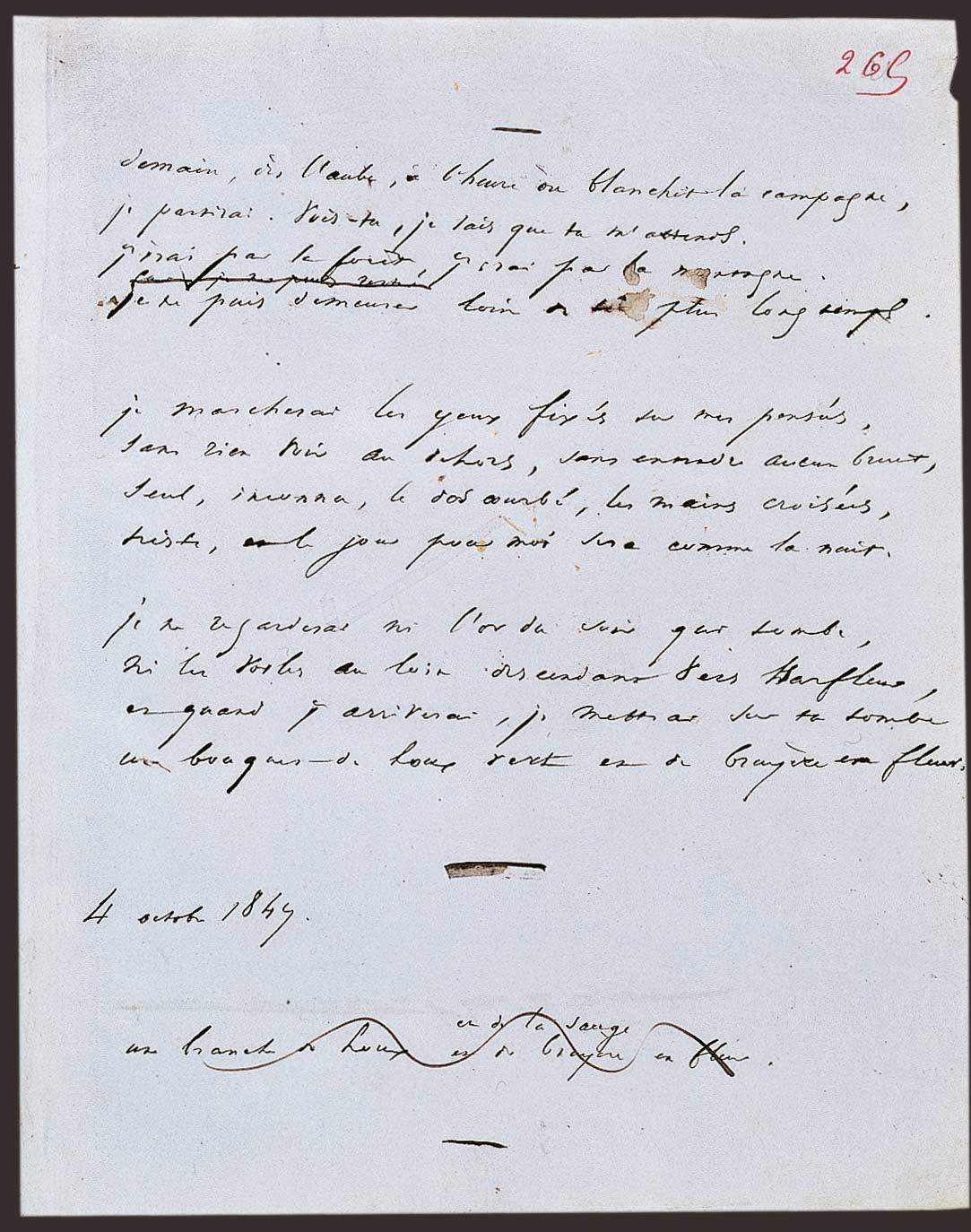
- Manuscript of the poem
- First published in: 1847
- Country: France
- Language: French
- Series: Les Contemplations
- Publication date: 1856
- Lines: 12

Demain dès l'aube (English: Tomorrow at dawn) is one of French writer Victor Hugo's most famous poems. It was published in his 1856 collection Les Contemplations. It consists of three quatrains of rhyming alexandrines. The poem describes a visit to his daughter Léopoldine Hugo's grave four years after her death.

== Text and translation ==
Demain, dès l'aube, à l'heure où blanchit la campagne,
Je partirai. Vois-tu, je sais que tu m'attends.
J'irai par la forêt, j'irai par la montagne.
Je ne puis demeurer loin de toi plus longtemps.

Je marcherai les yeux fixés sur mes pensées,
Sans rien voir au dehors, sans entendre aucun bruit,
Seul, inconnu, le dos courbé, les mains croisées,
Triste, et le jour pour moi sera comme la nuit.

Je ne regarderai ni l'or du soir qui tombe,
Ni les voiles au loin descendant vers Harfleur,
Et, quand j'arriverai, je mettrai sur ta tombe
Un bouquet de houx vert et de bruyère en fleur.

Translation:

Tomorrow, at dawn, at the moment when the day breaks,
I will go. You see, I know that you are waiting for me.
I will go through the forest, I will go across mountains.
I cannot stay away from you any longer.

I will walk eyes fixed on my thoughts,
Without seeing anything outside, without hearing a noise,
Alone, unknown, back hunched, hands crossed,
Sad, and the day for me will be as the night.

I will watch neither the gold of the evening setting sun,
Nor the faraway sailboats descending upon Harfleur.
And when I arrive, I will put on your grave
A bouquet of green holly and heather in bloom.
