= Louis Énault =

French journalist, novelist and translator (1824–1900)

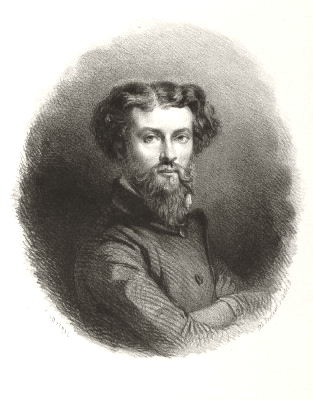

Louis Énault (1824 – 28 March 1900) was a French journalist, novelist and translator. He sometimes used the pseudonym Louis de Vernon.

== Life ==
Born in Isigny-sur-Mer, he trained as a lawyer in Paris and then, thanks to his links with the right-wing Legitimists, was arrested after the French Revolution of 1848. After his release he traveled in northern Europe and the Mediterranean, visiting Liguria in 1850 and giving a long description of Genoa's historic city centre in his travel journal Brève vision hivernale d'un voyageur normand. On his return to France in 1851, he was made a doctor of letters at Caen University after writing a thesis on Aeschylus.

Énault became a prominent man of letters, publishing fiction, nonfiction, and translations. He collaborated with Gustave Doré to produce an illustrated 1876 work on the industrial revolution in London, widely admired for the realism of its over 170 woodcuts and for its text, comparing London's architecture with the neoclassical monuments Énault had visited in Valletta on Malta during his travels on French medieval crusader routes. His translations into French included Uncle Tom's Cabin and The Sorrows of Young Werther.

He also wrote as an arts and literary critic for several publications including la Vie à la campagne, Le Nord (published in Belgium), Le Constitutionnel, La Gazette, Le Figaro and L'Illustration. In his "Chronique" column for La revue des jeux, des arts et du sport, Énault wrote a fiery rebuke of Émile Zola, occasioned by the production of a play based on Zola's novel l'Assommoir:

We must descend…to arrive at the thin personality of M. Zola, who would like to be the ox, but who is still only the frog.…L'Ambigu, who was never more comical, has just given us l'Assommoir.…It will perhaps mark the zenith of the most abject literary school [naturalism] that has ever held the attention of contemporaries. I do not think that her reign is long: disgust awaits her, and she will soon fall into it. M. Zola…who combines cynicism and platitude, sees in nature only the despicable and coarse. He prefers the polluted trickle of suburbs to the pure water of great lakes….He wallows voluptuously in all the turpitudes he cares to imagine, and drags his audience with him. This is a morbid case like scabies, like malignant and purulent pustules, or leprosy: it presents a case for the clinic, not the critic. We treat these people, but we don't talk about it in good company.…We have, in fact, too much respect for our readers to condemn them to an analysis of a piece like L'Assommoir.…These promiscuities without modesty and without love, these debauches without passion, these tableaux of rudeness thats revolt the delicate, these bad mores of the lowest order, without elegance, without grace and without varnish, these bouquets of poisonous plants growing on manure, would offer them only sadness without compensation.

In an open letter responding to Énault's diatribe, Émile Blavet identified Énault as the polar opposite of Zola: "You, my dear Énault, [are] the official painter of worldly elegance, the poet of veiled and delicate feelings, the historiographer of aristocratic adventures, the idealistic writer par excellence…."

Énault died in Paris. Celebrated in his lifetime but afterward little known, he is cited by Jules Romains as an example of a writer who knew notoriety and even glory but whose name meant nothing to the following generation.

== Works ==
=== Works translated into English ===
- The Pupil of the Legion of Honor, novel, translated by Mrs. Rebecca L. Tutt, with a preface by Énault (1871)
- Christine, novel, translated by Elizabeth W. Pendleton (1883)
- The Captain's Dog, a Story for Young and Old, novel, translated by Huntington Smith (1888); another translation (1880) is credited to J.A.A.
- Carine, a Story of Sweden, novel, translated by Linda da Kowalewska (1891)

=== Arts and history ===
- Eschyle (1851)
- Le Salon de 1852 (1852)
- Le Salon de 1853 (1853)
- Mémoires et correspondance de madame d'Épinay, précédées d'une étude sur sa vie et ses œuvres (1855) Online version
- Paris brûlé par la Commune (1871)
- Les Arts industriels : Vienne, Londres, Paris (1877)
- Les Beaux-Arts à l'Exposition universelle de 1878 (1878)
- Guide du Salon (3 volumes, 1880-1882)
- Paris-Salon (2 volumes, 1881-1883)

=== Travel writing ===
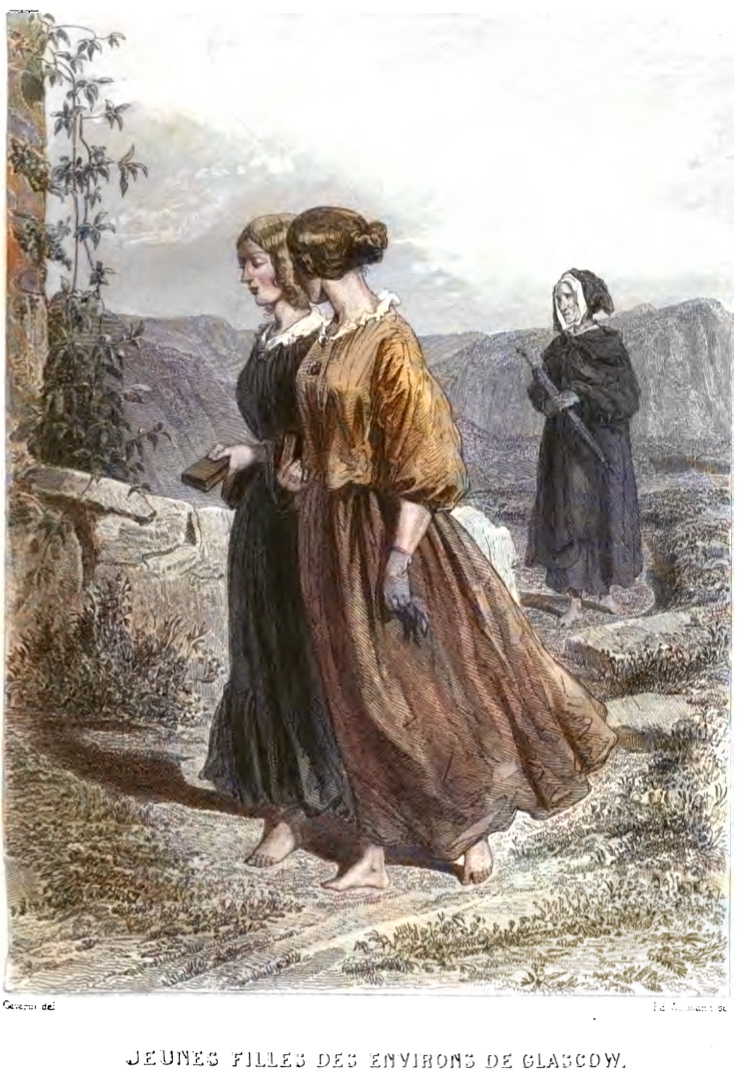
Young women near Glasgow, illustration by Gavarni for Angleterre, Écosse, Irlande, voyage pittoresque (A Picturesque Trip through England, Scotland and Ireland, 1859).

- Promenades en Belgique et sur les bords du Rhin (1852)
- La Terre-Sainte, voyage des quarante pèlerins en 1853 (1854) Texte en ligne
- Constantinople et la Turquie, tableau de l'Empire ottoman (1855)
- De Paris à Caen (1856)
- La Norvège (1857)
- Les Îles Hébrides (1858)
- La Vierge du Liban (1858)
- Angleterre, Écosse, Irlande, voyage pittoresque (1859)
- De Paris à Cherbourg, itinéraire historique et descriptif (1859)
- Nadèje (1859)
- Alba (1860) online version
- Histoire de la littérature des Hindous (1860)
- L'Inde pittoresque (1861)
- Frantz Müller [collaboration with Auguste de Châtillon] suivi du Rouet d'or et de Axel (1862) online version
- En province (1863)
- La Méditerranée, ses îles et ses bords (1863)
- L'Amérique centrale et méridionale (1867) Texte en ligne
- Londres, illustrated by Gustave Doré (1876)
- Après la mort. L'Enfer d'après des doctrines danoises et anglaises (1888)

=== Fiction and works for the stage ===
- La Rose blanche (1857)
- Christine (1858)
- La Rose blanche. Frère Jean. Les Amours de Chiffonnette (1858) online version
- Hermine (1860) online version
- L'Amour en voyage (1860)
- Un amour en Laponie (1861) online version
- Pêle-mêle, novels (1862)
- La Rose blanche. Inès. Une larme, ou Petite pluie abat grand vent (1863)
- Le Roman d'une veuve (1867)
- Un drame intime (1867)
- Le Mariage impromptu, stage comedy (1863)
- Olga (1864)
- Irène. Un mariage impromptu (1865)
- La Pupille de la Légion d'honneur (2 volumes, 1869)
- Histoire d'une femme (1872)
- Les Perles noires (1872)
- Le Secret de la confession (1872)
- Stella (1873)
- La Destinée (1873)
- Le Baptême du sang (2 volumes, 1873)
- La Vie à deux. Les Malheurs de Rosette. Les Aventures de Madeleine. La Race maudite (1874)
- La Circassienne (2 volumes, 1877)
- La Veuve (1877)
- Le Chien du capitaine. Trop curieux. Les Roses du docteur. Le Mont Saint-Michel (1880)
- Cordoval (serialised in Le Figaro in summer 1882, published by Hachette in November 1882)
- Les Diamants de la couronne (1884)
- Histoire d'amour (1884)
- Le Châtiment (1887)
- Valneige (1887)
- Le Château des anges (1889)
- Le Sacrifice (1890)
- Tragiques amours (1891)
- Le Mirage (1892)
- Jours d'épreuves (1894)
- La Tresse bleue. Aimée. La Chandelle romaine. Le Noël des oiseaux. Le Carnaval arlésien. Une rose au cap Nord. Un gentilhomme (1896)
- Pour un ! (1897)
- Le Rachat d'une âme (1897)
- Myrto (1898)
- Hôtel Ritz, place Vendôme 15, Paris (1899)
- Un drame au Marais (1899)

=== Translations ===
- Johann Wolfgang von Goethe : Werther (1855)
- Harriet Beecher Stowe : La Case de l'oncle Tom, ou Vie des nègres en Amérique (1859)

== Sources ==
- "Biographical Notice" in Le chien du capitaine by Louis Enault, Toronto: The W.J. Gage Company, undated, pp. v-vi.
- Chamberlain, A.F. "Sketch of Énault's Life and Works" in Le chien du capitaine by Louis Enault, Toronto: W.J. Gage & Co., 1890, pp. 1-2.
- Fontaine, C. Preface, Le chien du capitaine by Louis Enault, Boston: D.C. Heath & Co., 1903, pp. 3-4.
