= Villequier =

- Part of Rives-en-Seine
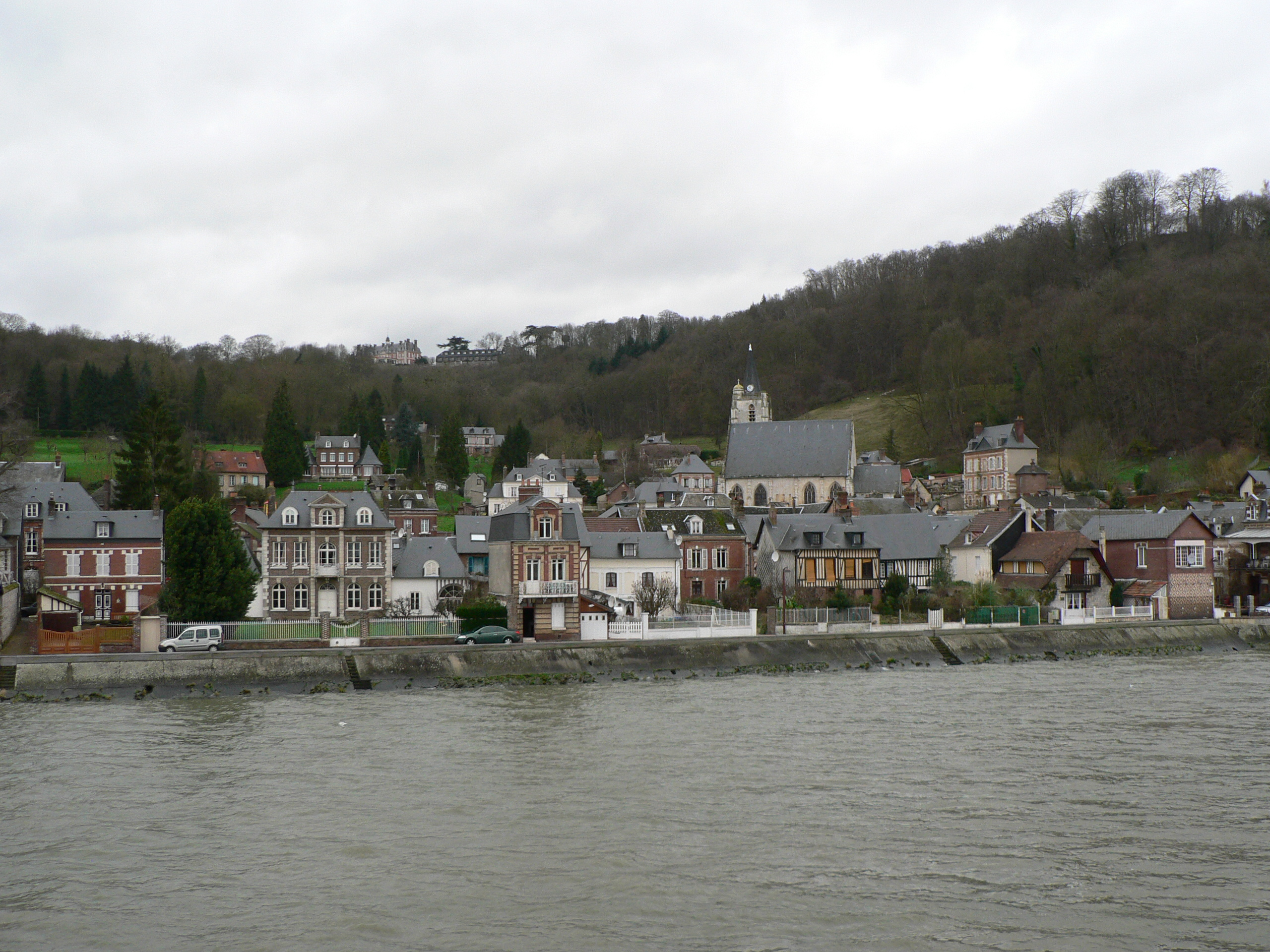

- Coat of arms
- Location of Villequier
- Location within France Location within Normandy
- Coordinates: 49°30′49″N 0°40′29″E
- Country: France
- Region: Normandy
- Department: Seine-Maritime
- Arrondissement: Rouen
- Canton: Notre-Dame-de-Gravenchon
- Commune: Rives-en-Seine
- Area^{1}: 11.1 km^{2} (4.3 sq mi)
- Elevation: 6 m (20 ft)
- Highest elevation: 147 m (482 ft)
- Lowest elevation: 0 m (0 ft)
- Population (2023): 654
  - Density: 58.9/km^{2} (153/sq mi)
- Time zone: UTC+01:00 (CET)
  - Summer (DST): UTC+02:00 (CEST)
- Postal code: 76490
- ^{1} French Land Register data, which excludes lakes, ponds, glaciers > 1 km^{2} (0.386 sq mi or 247 acres) and river estuaries.

Villequier (French pronunciation: [vilkje]) is a former commune in the Seine-Maritime department in the Normandy region in northern France. On 1 January 2016, it was merged into the new commune of Rives-en-Seine.

== Geography ==
A village of farming and forestry situated by the banks of the river Seine in the Pays de Caux, some 23 miles (37 km) west of Rouen near the junction of the D281 with the D81 road.

== Heraldry ==
Arms of Villequier	The arms of Villequier are blazoned : Gules, on a cross fleury between 12 billets Or, an anchor sable.

== Places of interest ==
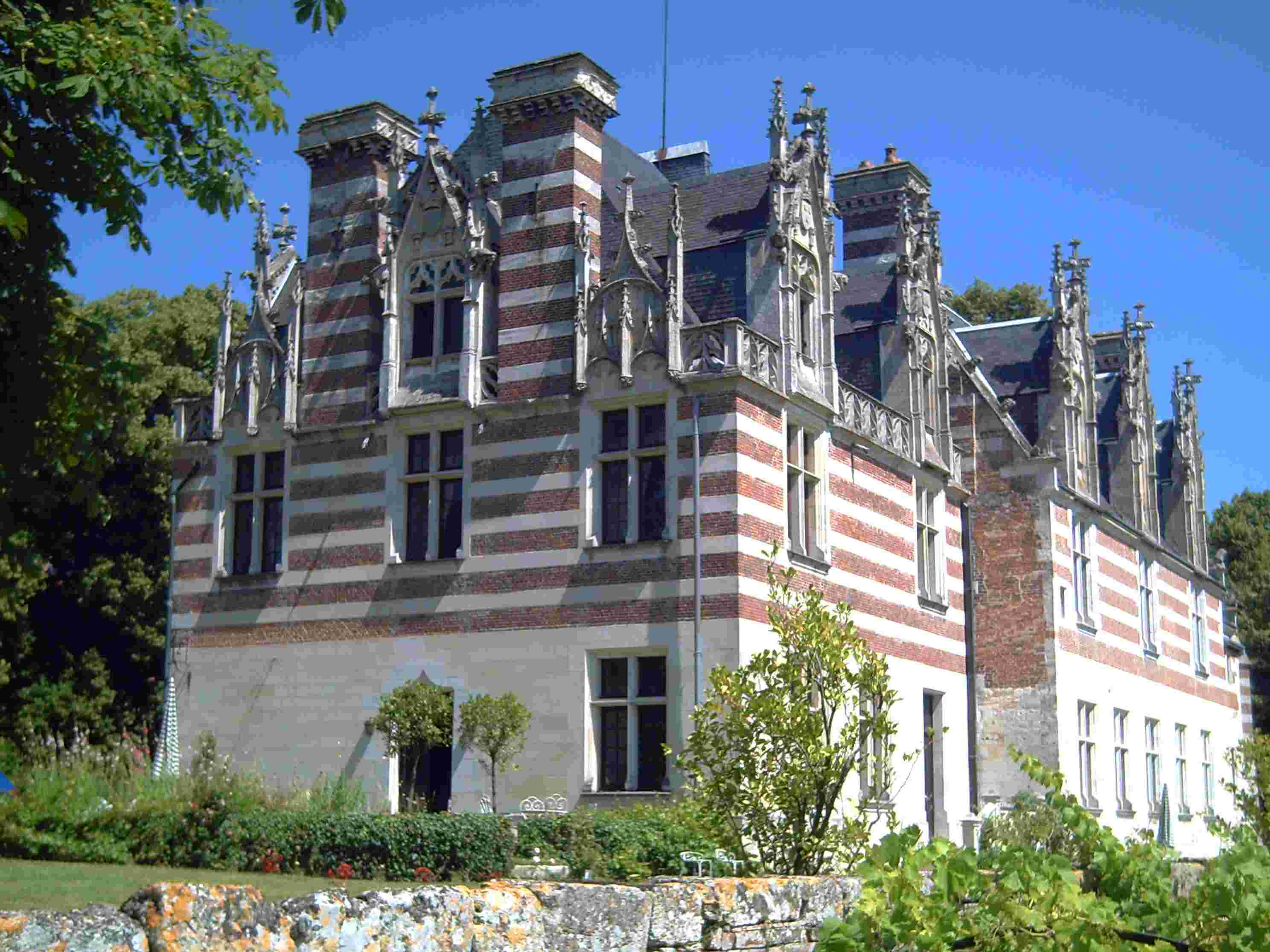
Chateau of Etelan

- The church of St. Pierre, dating from the sixteenth century.
- The church of St. Martin, dating from the twelfth century.
- The fifteenth-century chateau of Ételan, with its park and a dovecote.
- Medieval fortifications at La Guerche.
- Three seventeenth-century manorhouses.
- An eighteenth-century presbytery.
- The chapel of Barre-Y-Va.
- The Victor Hugo museum.
- The Hugo family tombs in the cemetery.

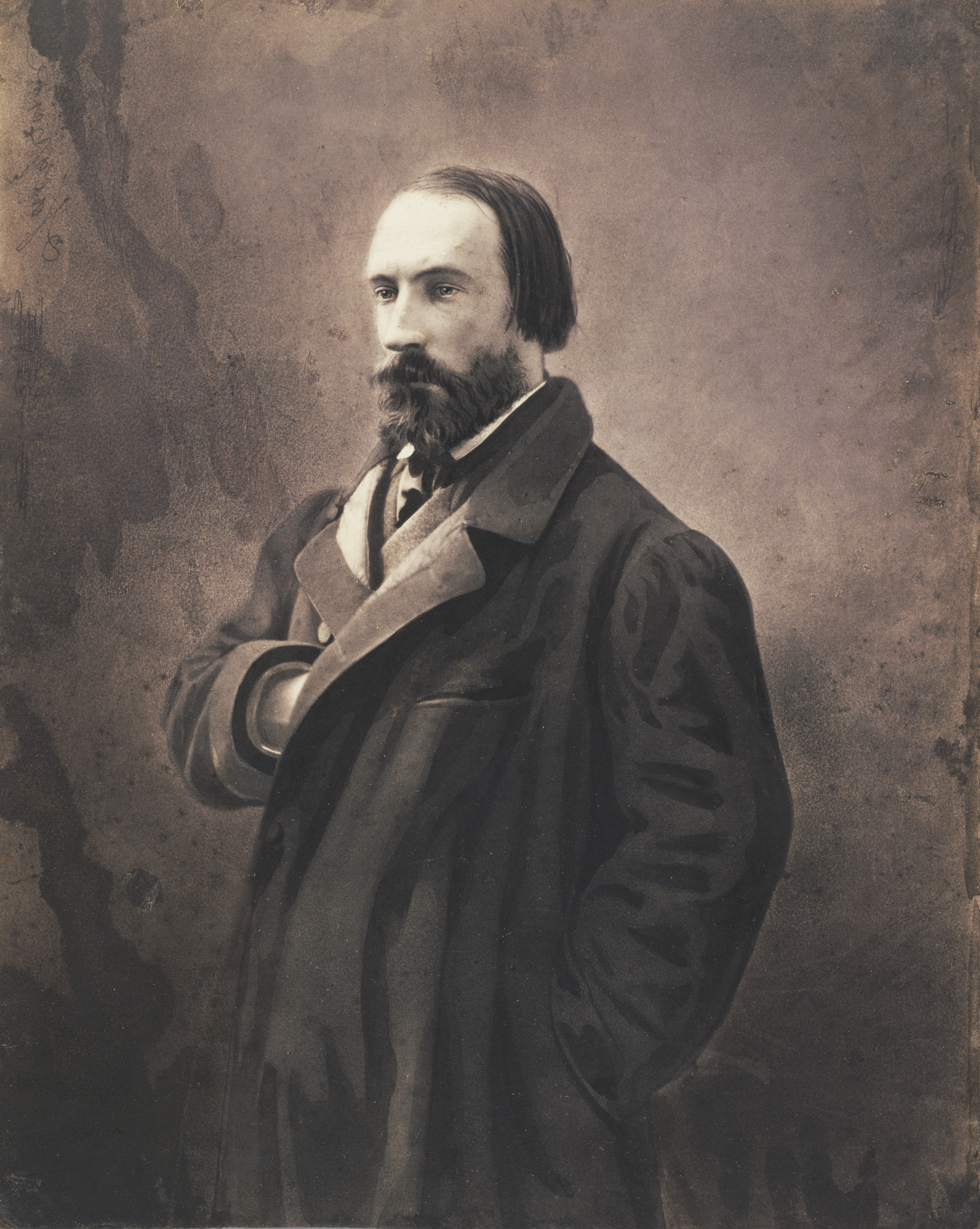
Auguste Vacquerie

== People ==
- Victor Hugo (1802–1895), dramatist, spent much time here with his friends and family. His daughter Léopoldine Hugo drowned in Villequier in 1843.
- Auguste Vacquerie (1819–1895), poet and journalist, was born here and is buried here.

== See also ==
- Communes of the Seine-Maritime department
