= Saint-Wandrille-Rançon =

- Part of Rives-en-Seine
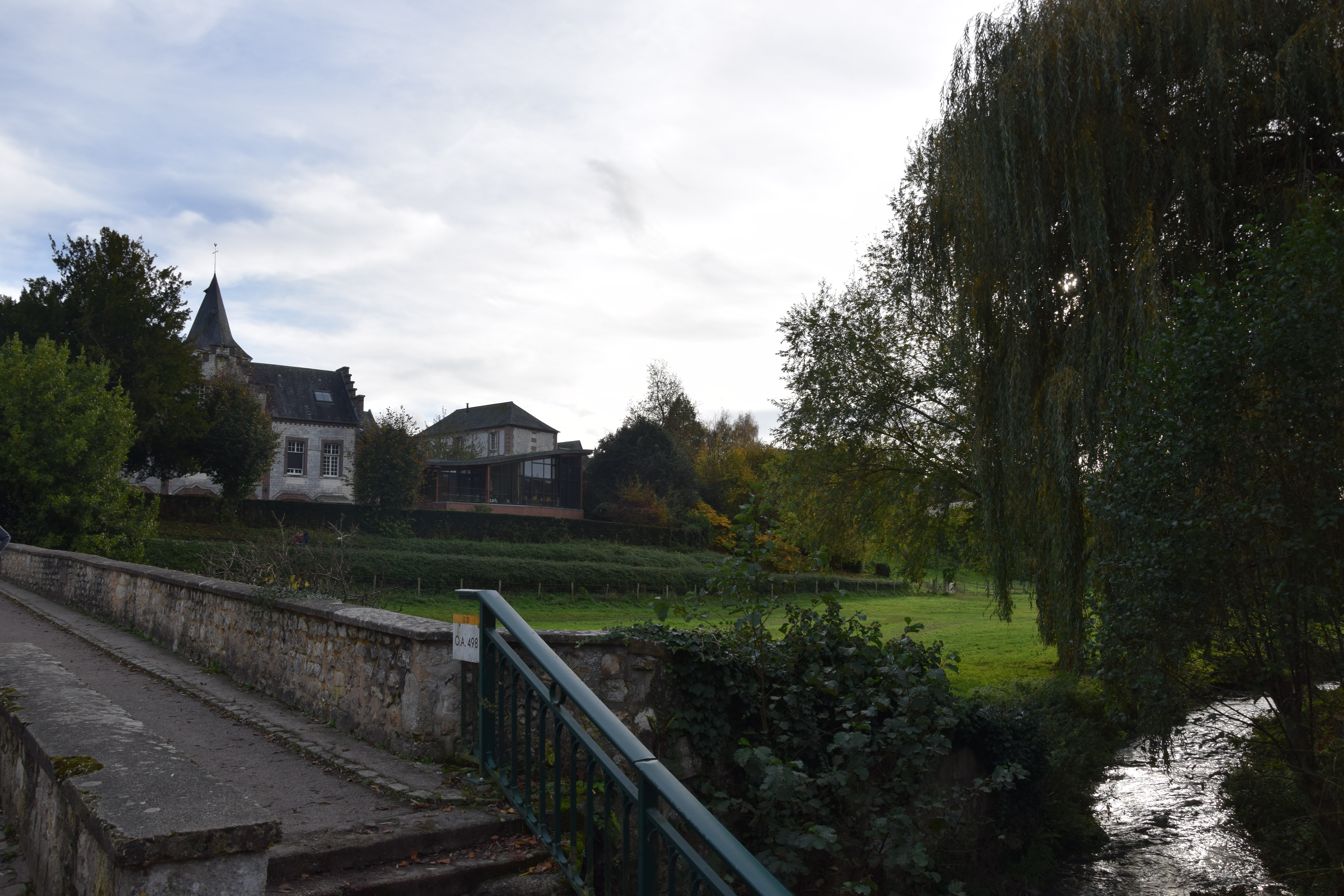
- Location of Saint-Wandrille-Rançon
- Location within France Location within Normandy
- Coordinates: 49°31′41″N 0°46′05″E
- Country: France
- Region: Normandy
- Department: Seine-Maritime
- Arrondissement: Rouen
- Canton: Notre-Dame-de-Gravenchon
- Commune: Rives-en-Seine
- Area^{1}: 18.11 km^{2} (6.99 sq mi)
- Elevation: 16 m (52 ft)
- Highest elevation: 122 m (400 ft)
- Lowest elevation: 2 m (6.6 ft)
- Population (2022): 1,149
  - Density: 63.45/km^{2} (164.3/sq mi)
- Time zone: UTC+01:00 (CET)
  - Summer (DST): UTC+02:00 (CEST)
- Postal code: 76490
- ^{1} French Land Register data, which excludes lakes, ponds, glaciers > 1 km^{2} (0.386 sq mi or 247 acres) and river estuaries.

Saint-Wandrille-Rançon (French pronunciation: [sɛ̃ vɑ̃dʁij ʁɑ̃sɔ̃]) is a former commune in the Seine-Maritime department in the Normandy region in north west France. On 1 January 2016, it was merged into the new commune of Rives-en-Seine.

== Geography ==
A village of farming and forestry situated by the banks of the Seine, some 18 miles (29 km) north-west of Rouen at the junction of the D22, D33 and the D982 roads. Until 1960, the Pont de Brotonne was the first bridging point of the Seine. Today it carries the D490 over the river.

== Heraldry ==
Arms of Saint-Wandrille-Rançon	The arms of Saint-Wandrille-Rançon are blazoned: Vert, a pall wavy Argent between one mill wheel and two fleurs-de-lys Or.

== Places of interest ==
It is celebrated for the ruins of its Benedictine abbey, the Abbey of Saint Wandrille (formerly known as Fontenelle Abbey). The abbey church belongs to the 13th and 14th centuries; portions of the nave walls supported by flying buttresses are standing, and the windows and vaulting of the side aisles are in fair preservation. The church is joined to cloisters from which an interesting door of the Renaissance period opens into the refectory. Beside this entrance is a richly ornamented lavabo of the Renaissance period. The refectory is a room over 100 ft. long and lit by graceful windows of the same period. The abbey was founded in the 7th century by Saint Wandrille, aided by donations from Clovis II. It soon became renowned for learning and piety. In the 13th century it was burnt down, and rebuilding was not completed till the beginning of the 16th century. Later in the same century it was practically destroyed by the Huguenots, and again the restoration was not finished for more than a hundred years. The demolition of the church began at the time of the Revolution but stopped in 1832.

== Population ==
Historical population
Year	Pop.	±% p.a.
1962	1,061	—
1968	1,106	+0.69%
1975	1,261	+1.89%
1982	1,184	−0.90%
1990	1,151	−0.35%
1999	1,172	+0.20%
2013	1,196	+0.14%
2022	1,149	−0.44%
Source: EHESS and INSEE

== See also ==
- Communes of the Seine-Maritime department
