= Gérard Leseul =

French politician

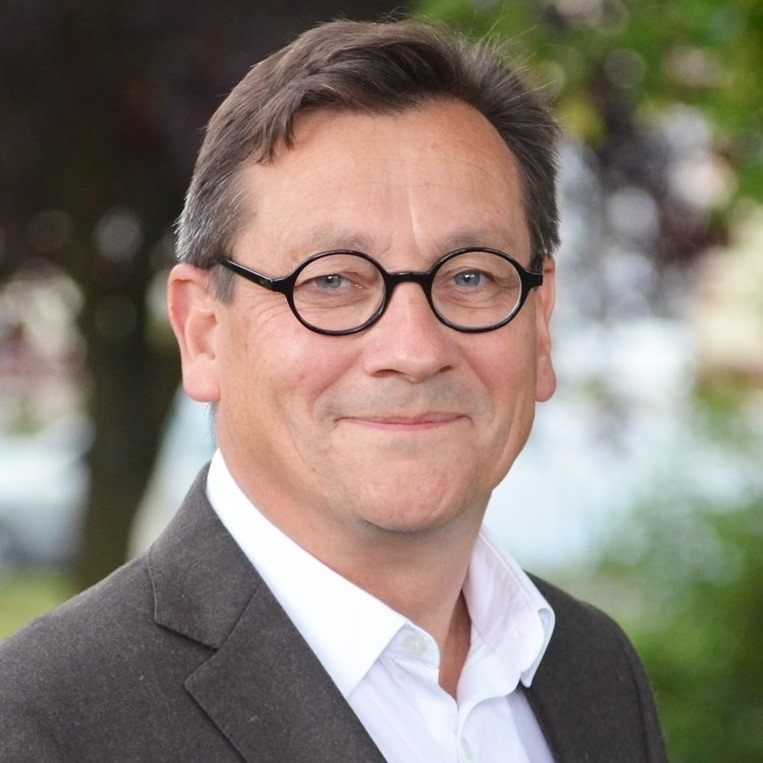
- Leseul in September 2020

Member of the National Assembly for Seine-Maritime's 5th constituency
- Incumbent
- Assumed office 28 September 2020
- Preceded by: Bastien Coriton

Personal details
- Born: 15 August 1960 (age 65) Le Mesnil-Esnard, Seine-Maritime, France
- Party: Socialist Party

Gérard Leseul (born 15 August 1960) is a French politician who has been Member of Parliament for Seine-Maritime's 5th constituency since winning the 2020 by-election.

== Political career ==
In parliament, Leseul serves on the Committee on Sustainable Development and Regional Planning and the Parliamentary Office for the Evaluation of Scientific and Technological Choices (OPECST).
