= Christophe Bouillon =

French politician (born 1969)

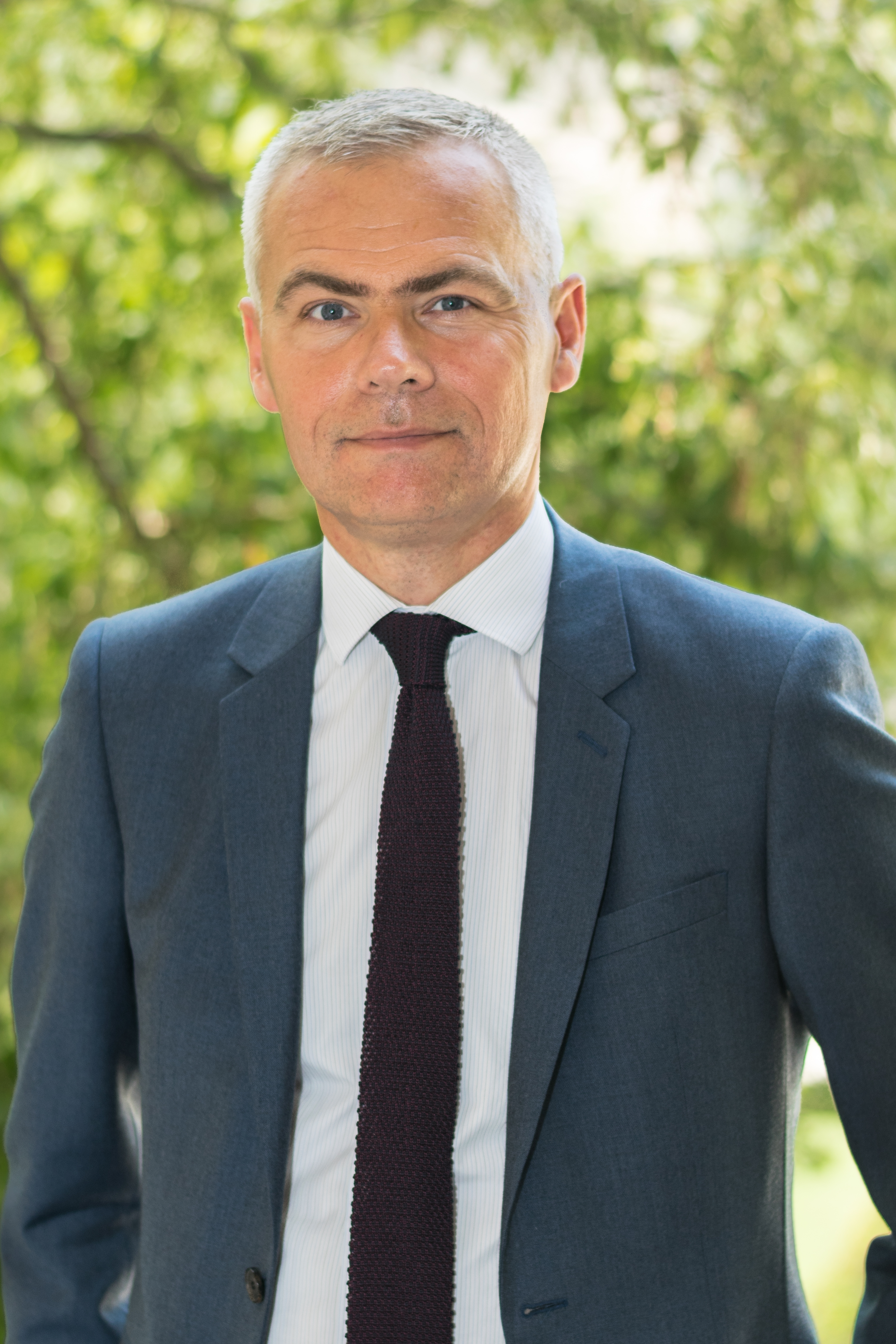
- Christophe Bouillon in 2017

Mayor of Barentin
- Incumbent
- Assumed office 28 July 2020
- Preceded by: Michel Bentot

Mayor of Canteleu
- In office 19 March 2001 – 5 April 2014
- Preceded by: Christian Bêcle
- Succeeded by: Mélanie Boulanger

Member of the National Assembly for Seine-Maritime's 5th constituency
- In office 20 June 2007 – 18 June 2020
- Preceded by: Jean-Claude Bateux
- Succeeded by: Bastien Coriton

Personal details
- Born: 4 March 1969 (age 57) Rouen, France
- Party: Socialist Party
- Education: University of Rouen

Christophe Bouillon (born 4 March 1969) was a member of the National Assembly of France from 2007 to 2020. He represented Seine-Maritime's 5th constituency as a member of the Socialist, Radical, Citizen and Miscellaneous Left. From 2015 to 2018 he was chairman of the board of ANDRA, the French National Radioactive Waste Management Agency.

He was elected mayor of Barentin on 28 May 2020 and resigned from the National Assembly on 18 June because of cumulation of mandates. His substitute, Bastien Coriton, was also elected mayor in Rives-en-Seine, so resigned from the assembly five days after taking office. A by-election was called for 20 and 27 September 2020.

On July 15, 2021, he announced that he was leaving the Socialist Party.

After the resignation of Caroline Cayeux, who was appointed Minister Delegate for Territorial Communities by Élisabeth Borne, and the interim period of Michel Fournier, he was elected President by the members of the board of directors of the National Agency for Territorial Cohesion on December 13, 2022.
