= Léopoldine Hugo =

Daughter of Victor Hugo

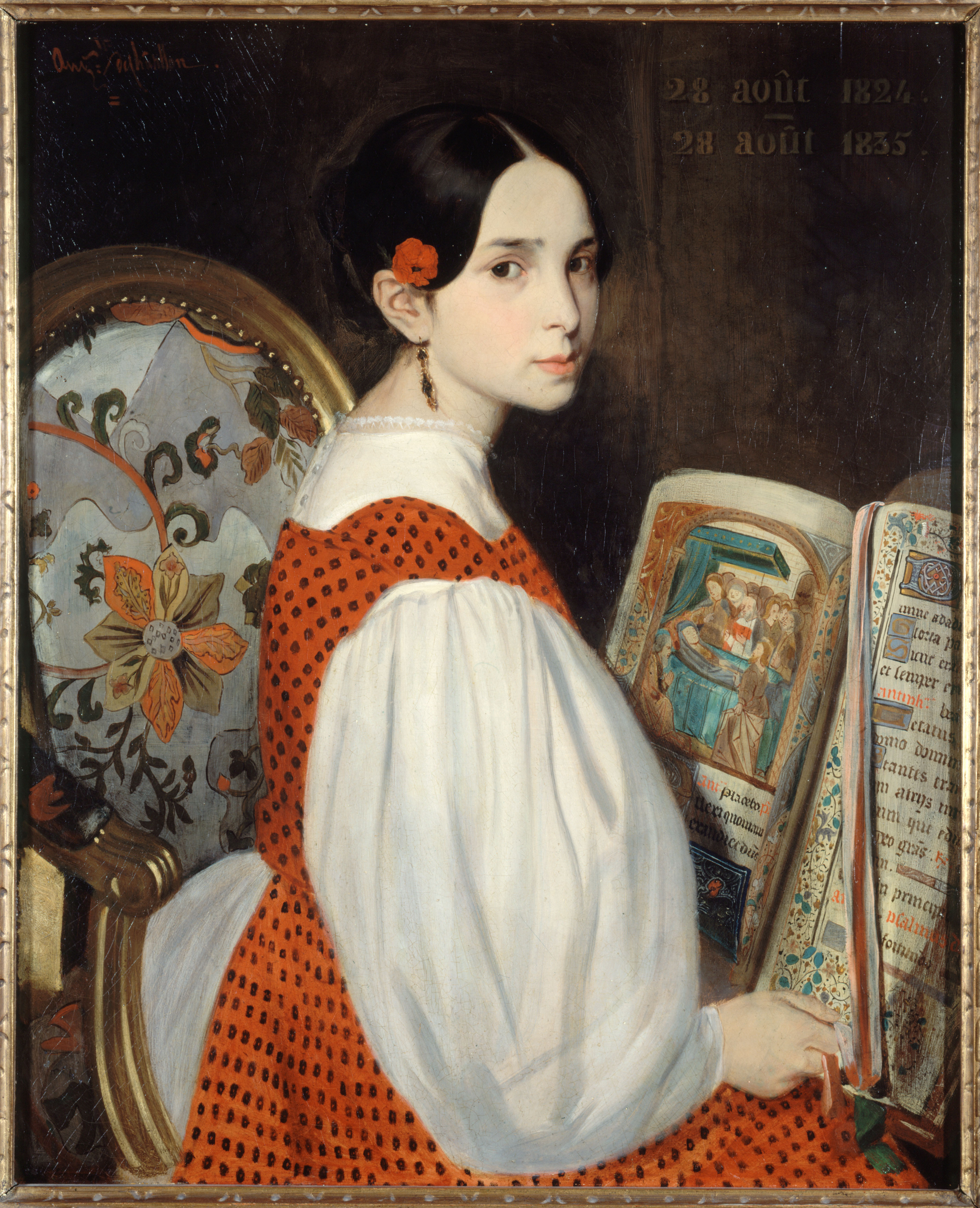
- Portrait of Léopoldine Hugo. Painted by Auguste de Châtillon in 1836, on the day of her first communion.
- Born: Léopoldine Cécile Marie-Pierre Catherine Hugo; 28 August 1824; Paris, Kingdom of France
- Died: 4 September 1843 (aged 19); Villequier, Kingdom of France
- Spouse: Charles Vacquerie (m. 1843)
- Parent(s): Victor Hugo; Adèle Foucher

Léopoldine Cécile Marie-Pierre Catherine Hugo (French pronunciation: [leɔpɔldin sesil maʁi pjɛʁ katʁin yɡo]; 28 August 1824 – 4 September 1843) was the eldest daughter of Victor Hugo and Adèle Foucher.

== Early life ==
Léopoldine was born in Paris, the second of five children and eldest daughter of Victor Hugo and Adèle Foucher. She was named after her paternal grandfather, Joseph Léopold Sigisbert Hugo, as was her late brother, Léopold, who died in infancy.

Despite her father's growing anti-clerical views, Léopoldine grew up as a devout Catholic. Her first communion, which took place in September 1836, was a grand affair. Auguste de Châtillon painted a portrait of her for the day, and the mass was attended by Théophile Gautier, Alexandre Dumas, and members of the Hugo family. A banquet was held at her family's Paris residence afterward.

Léopoldine had many suitors for marriage including her future husband, Charles Vacquerie, whom she met while on holiday in 1839.

== Later life and death ==
She married Charles Vacquerie at Saint-Paul-Saint-Louis on 14 February 1843, but they both drowned together only a few months later, when their boat overturned on the Seine in Villequier on 4 September 1843. Nineteen years old, she died when her wet, heavy skirts pulled her down, and her husband died trying to save her. This tragic event had a great impact on the work and personality of her father, Victor Hugo. He dedicated numerous poems to the memory of his daughter, notably Demain dès l'aube and À Villequier in Pauca Meae, the fourth book of Les Contemplations. Victor Hugo did not write for several years afterwards owing to the clinical depression he developed following Léopoldine's death.
