= Pall (heraldry) =

Heraldic charge

Argent, a pall gules

A pall (or pairle) in heraldry and vexillology is a Y-shaped charge, normally having its arms in the three corners of the shield. An example of a pall placed horizontally (fesswise) is the green portion of the South African national flag.

Argent, a pall reversed gules

Argent, a shakefork gules

Tierced per pall

A pall that stops short of the shield's edges and that has pointed ends to its three limbs is called a shakefork, although some heraldic sources do not make a distinction between a pall and a shakefork. A pall standing upside down is named pall reversed.

An ecclesiastical pall on a shield, or pallium, is the heraldic indicator of archbishoprics. These palls usually have a lower limb that stops short of the bottom of the shield with a fringe.

Palls can also be modified with heraldic lines. One example is the coat of Saint-Wandrille-Rançon, displayed below (third). The wavy heraldic line on a pall can be used to represent a river, or a confluence thereof, as in the arms of Nigeria (the rivers Niger and Benue, which join at Lokoja).

A field may be divided into three parts, tierced per pall (or in pairle), resembling a combination of division per chevron and per pale. Charges may be borne in pall, that is, arranged in a form resembling a pall.

== Gallery ==
Arms of the Earl of Glencairn, chief of Clan Cunningham: Argent, a shakefork sable

Arms of the See of Canterbury with an episcopal pallium

Arms of the town of Saint-Wandrille-Rançon:
Vert, a pall wavy Argent accompanied in chief by one mill wheel Or and flanked by two fleurs-de-lys of the same.

Arms of the city of Khabarovsk

Coat of arms of Nigeria

Coat of Arms of Otto von Bismarck (oak leaves in pall)

Seal of Shanghai Municipal Council, Shanghai International Settlement

=== Flags with palls ===
Flag of South Africa

Flag of Vanuatu

Flag of Tuva, Russian Federation

Flag of St. Louis, Missouri, US

Flag of Cook County, Illinois, US

An ethnic flag of the Tat People (party per pall fimbriated)

=== Flags party per pall ===
Flag of the Czech Republic

Flag of Djibouti

Flag of Republic of the Philippines

Flag of Marquesas Islands (French Polynesia)

Flag of Martinique, France

Flag of Sint Maarten, Netherlands

Flag of the United States Secret Service

Flag of Khabarovsk Krai, Russia

Flag of Zabaykalsky Krai, Russia

=== Flags with charges in pall ===
Flag of Tremp, Lleida, Catalonia, Spain

Flag of Vojvodina, Serbia

Former house flag of the Hamburg Atlantic Line (1958-1973; 1991-1997)

Flag of Oita Prefecture, Japan

County Flag of Merseyside, England, United Kingdom

Flag of the Shanghai International Settlement
(flag escutcheons)

== See also ==
Pile (heraldry)
Gusset (heraldry)
Fillet (heraldry)
Saltire
