= Les Contemplations =

Collection of poetry by Victor Hugo

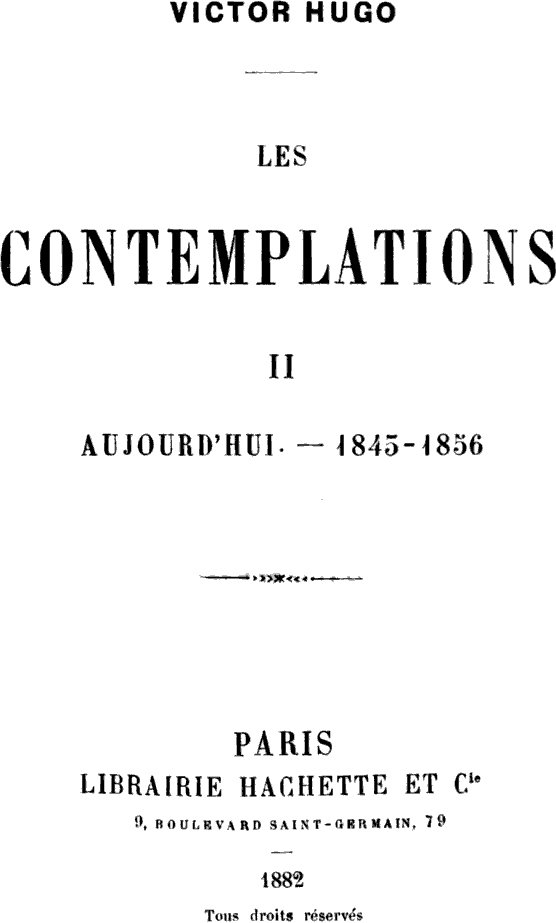
- Author: Victor Hugo
- Original title: Les Contemplations
- Language: French
- Publisher: 1856
- Publication date: 1859, 1877, 1883
- Publication place: France
- Media type: Print

Les Contemplations (French pronunciation: [le kɔ̃tɑ̃plɑsjɔ̃]; The Contemplations) is a song and collection of poetry by Victor Hugo, published in 1856. It consists of 156 poems in six books. Most of the poems were written between 1841 and 1855, though the oldest date from 1830. Memory plays an important role in the collection, as Hugo was experimenting with the genre of autobiography in verse. The collection is equally an homage to his daughter Léopoldine Hugo, who drowned in the Seine in 1843.

== Structure of the book ==
The book is organized into two parts, entitled Autrefois and Aujourd'hui respectively, each comprising three chapters.

- Autrefois (1830 - 1843)
- I. Aurore : It is the book of youth evoking the memories of the poet's college, his first love affairs and his first literary struggles.
- II. L'âme en fleur : It is the book of love, made up of poems evoking the early days of his union with Juliette Drouet.
- III. Les luttes et les rêves : It is the book of pity and the first step towards the consideration of the misery of the world.
- Aujourd'hui (1843 - 1855)
- IV. Pauca meae : It is the book of mourning where the poet tries to establish a form of communication with his daughter despite death.
- V. En marche :It is the book of rediscovered energy where the expatriate poet will seek new reasons to live in meditation.
- VI. Au bord de l'infini : It is the book of certainties. There reigns a fantastic and supernatural atmosphere, crossed by specters, angels and spirits who bring revelations to the poet. Anguish still alternates with hope, but in the end it is hope that wins out.
- À celle qui est restée en France : Epilogue consisting of eight sections. It is dedicated to Léopoldine Hugo, the poet's daughter who died drowned in the Seine, who occupies a central place in this collection.

At first glance, the collection appears to be organized in chronological order. But Victor Hugo distorted the date of writing of some of his poems. It must be deduced from this that the chosen order is more psychological than historical.

== Les Contemplations as a collection of love ==
Love in Les Contemplations takes different forms. It may be the clumsy love of the young man (Vieille chanson du jeune temps). It is a love where the expression of feelings is awkward and hesitant.

Sensual love is also important. The sensuality is either discreet (as in the majority of poems) or, exceptionally, erotic. Love is thus a source of happiness and joy.

== Amorous lyricism and nature ==
The poems of love are also poems of nature: "we went to the orchard to pick cherries". The lyricism of love mingles with the lyricism of nature without them being confused. It is not unhappy love that Hugo sings about, but on the contrary love as a source of plenitude, of happiness for two and of communion with nature.

The poet expresses nature and love in the form of short poems, as if Hugo was more trying to capture a fleeting moment than to give a long picture of his feelings. Hugo concentrates on a few parts of reality, thus giving a fragmented image: he does not portray the woman he loves from head to toe, but evokes her neck or her feet and her hair. Nature itself is described in a very fragmentary way: Hugo evokes a tree and its branches, the shore and the bulrushes. In love poems, love and nature are intimately linked, making nature appear as the privileged space for the fusion of the poet and the beloved woman.

== Les Contemplations as a work of mourning ==
The Contemplations are above all a collection of nostalgia and in particular of the memory of Léopoldine, the poet's daughter, who died drowned in the Seine with her husband on September 4, 1843, whose death Hugo learned of by chance in the press on September 9, 1843 in Rochefort, when he returned from a trip to Spain with Juliette Drouet. The death of his daughter indeed conditions the structure of the book and its separation into two parts.

Hugo chooses the verses to tell the crossing of his mourning, these allow to shape this painful experience and to overcome it. Poetic constraint is a way of channeling affect by casting the informal as into a mold of pre-existing forms; the sonnet or the rhythmic structures.

The recipient of Pauca meae seems to be first of all his daughter Léopoldine, to whom Hugo addresses himself. He writes, for example, "you see, I know you are waiting for me". The poet, who no longer seems able to understand the designs of God, also addresses other men because his sufferings are those of all: “homo sum” he writes in the preface. Poetry appeals to universal feelings.

The poet evokes the happy moments spent with his daughter: Hugo also evokes the tales he told to his children. The title pauca meae refers to her daughter. Since pauca means "few things" and meae "mine", it could be translated as "the few things left for/of my daughter". The moments spent together are always evoked in a vague and fragmentary way: among the seventeen poems of Pauca meae, only four poems describe scenes from the past. Pauca meae are above all poems of suffering: pain is mentioned in nine of the seventeen poems that make up Pauca meae.

Hugo also clearly shows his refusal of death and never ceases to question God as to the meaning of Leopoldine's death. The death of Léopoldine shakes Hugo's faith and his trust in God. and even the idea that the Poet must become a messenger of God and a guide to peoples (an idea that is old for Hugo). At the same time, Hugo confesses his inability to understand the designs of God and his submission to the divine will. Hugo sketches the idea that life ends with a mystery that no one can understand.

As for Hugo's tone and style, his language and poetry are characterized by their simplicity. The same rhymes recur from one poem to another. Hugo rejects pathos; he thus uses a double to talk about his own suffering, thus giving the impression of talking about someone else. He avoids exaggerating his personal lyricism, writing for example in: "I will not watch the gold of the falling evening / Nor the sails in the distance descending towards Harfleur" as if to reject easy sentimentality.

== The Mystic of the Poet ==
In 1853, the rotating table sessions took place at Delphine de Girardin's. This experience allows the poet to form a new religion, very precisely evoked in the poem of the Contemplations entitled "What the mouth of shadow says". Pantheism and Christianity mingle there to form a thought that is both religious and philosophical.

The very idea of "contemplation" (from the Latin contemplari, meaning both "to gaze attentively" and "to consider in thought") plays on the religious origin of the word (which in ancient Rome belongs to the augural language) : it is, for the dreamer (because "to dream", "to dream" and "to contemplate" are used almost interchangeably in the collection), to fix his gaze on nature until he perceives, beyond the visible, the abstract meaning it delivers. In the pan of reality delimited by his gaze, the contemplator strives to interpret signs: nature is a book where the divine text is given to decipher. The importance given by the collection to the vision must therefore be linked to the Hugolian conception of the divine.

Hugo's god is neither entirely impersonal nor entirely anthropomorphic: rather, he is the voice of conscience, an intimate and living form of moral law. It is an all-powerful but unknowable god for man, and of which Christianity would offer only an approximate image, because it would be a question of a universal entity and freed from all religion. Hugo believes in the supernatural character of poetry which would allow him to translate the voice of the beyond. The poet is for him a seer and a messenger of the infinite.

Finally, Les Contemplations are for Hugo the opportunity to affirm his belief in the immortality of the soul and in metempsychosis.

== Place Les Contemplations in the work of Hugo ==
Admittedly, the collection of Contemplations in its first part prolongs the lyricism of earlier works such as Les Rayons et les ombres, but it is also a break with this lyricism, announcing a darker poetry. The Contemplations constitute a major work which corresponds to a second poetic birth of Victor Hugo.
