= Auguste de Châtillon =

French painter, sculptor and poet (1808–1881)

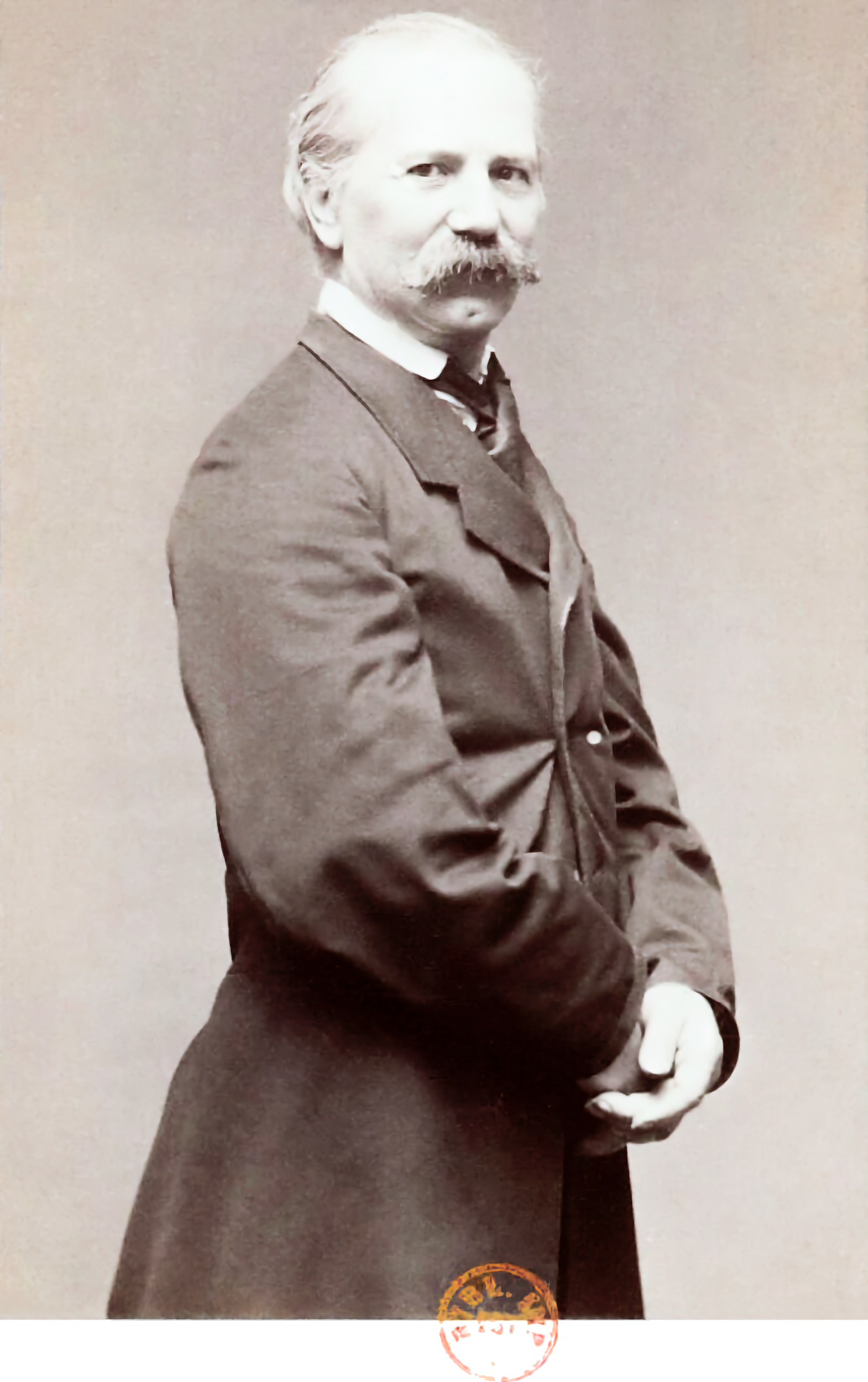
Photograph of de Châtillon by Étienne Carjat, c. 1860s

Auguste de Châtillon (French pronunciation: [oɡyst də ʃatijɔ̃]; 29 January 1808 – 26 March 1881) was a French painter, sculptor and poet. He was born and died in Paris. He, Théophile Gautier, Gérard de Nerval and Arsène Houssaye formed the "bohème du Doyenné".

== Life ==
He first exhibited at the Paris Salon of 1831, initially painting portraits of subjects such as Gautier, Victor Hugo and Hugo's family, including one of Hugo and his son François-Victor and another of Hugo's daughter Léopoldine. He designed costumes for Hugo's 1832 premiere Le Roi s’amuse and painted the woodwork in de Nerval's living room. He lived in New Orleans from 1844 to 1851 and on his return to France published a poetry collection in 1855 entitled Chant et poésie, which was twice republished and expanded under the title À la Grand'Pinte, poésies d'Auguste de Châtillon in 1860 and as Les Poésies d'Auguste Châtillon in 1866. In the preface to the 1855 edition, Gautier wrote of the writer-painter "he reconciles simplicity and artifice, and his poems can bawl at the cabaret and sign in the living-room. In a short letter to him on 8 April 1869, Hugo wrote "There is something in you of La Fontaine's easy grace combined with an extra melancholy charm". The collection includes works in both Romantic and earlier styles, portraits of the time and evocations of Montmartre and New Orleans. The two most noted poems at the time were À la Grand’Pinte and La Levrette en paletot.

== Gallery ==
Works by Auguste de Châtillon

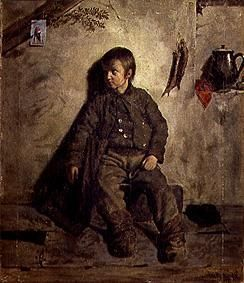
Le Petit Ramoneur (1832), location unknown

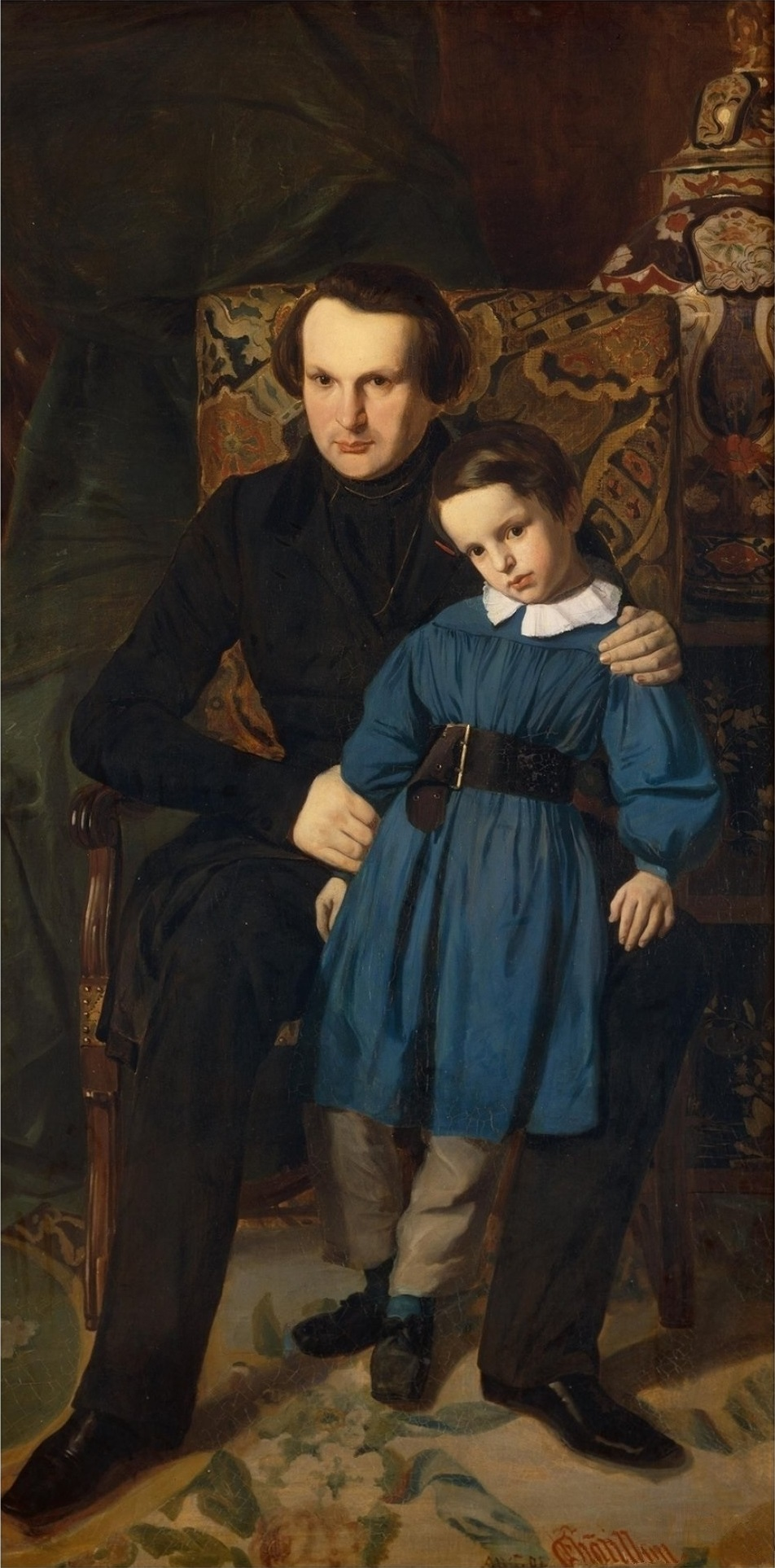
Victor Hugo and his son François-Victor (1836), Maison de Victor Hugo, Paris.

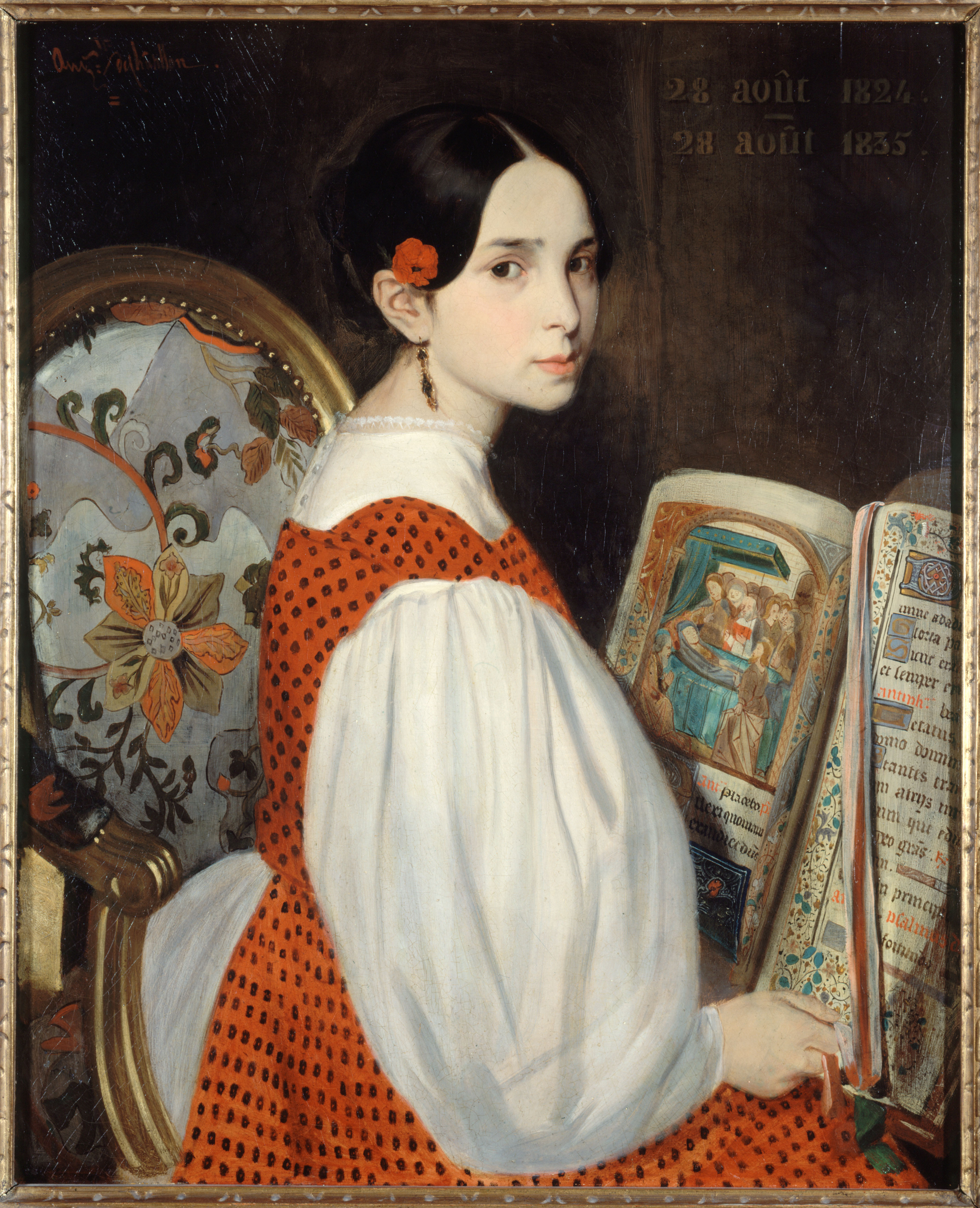
Léopoldine Hugo (1836), daughter of Victor Hugo, on the day of her first communion, Maison de Victor Hugo, Paris.

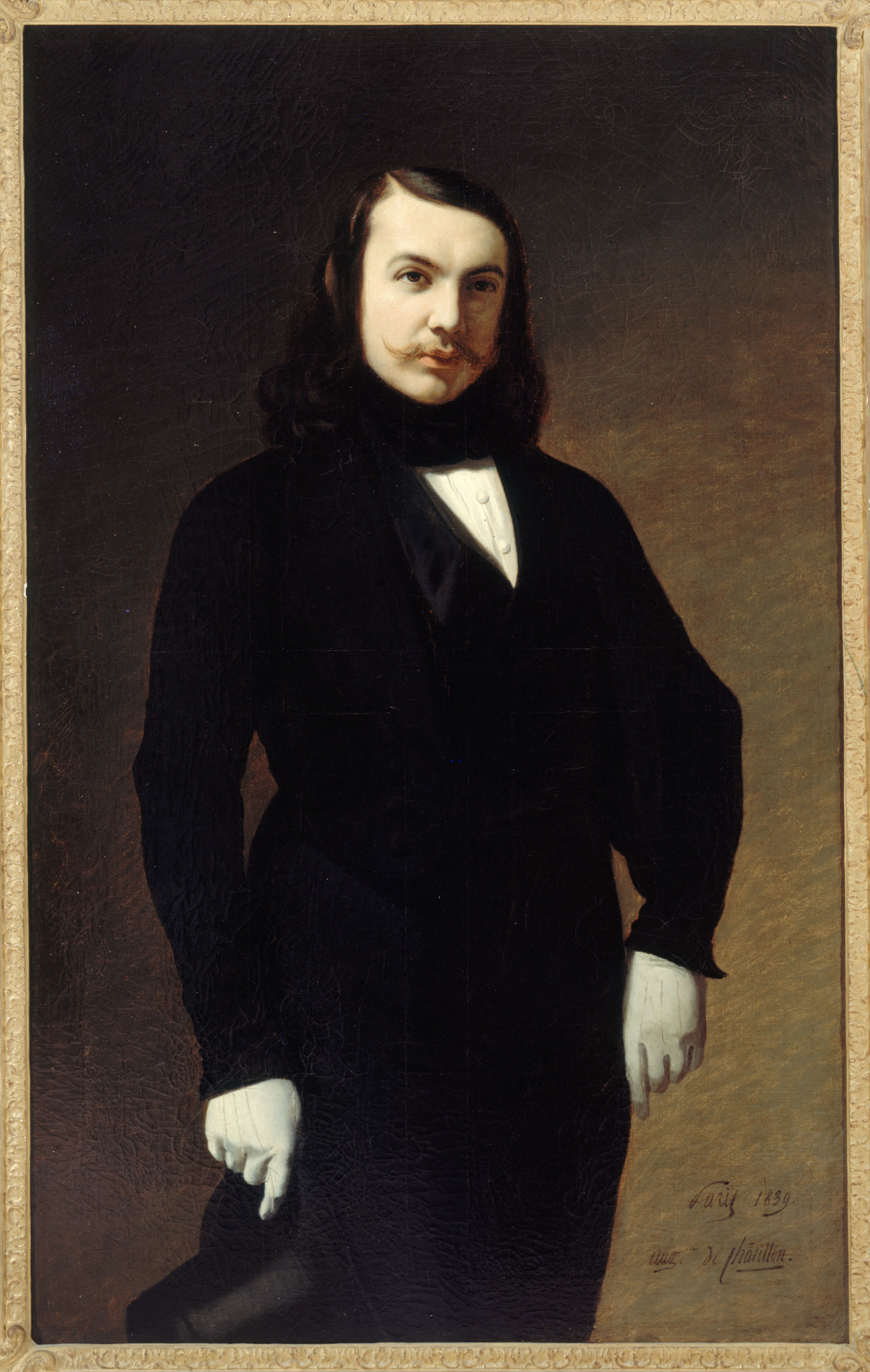
Théophile Gautier (1839), musée de la Vie Romantique, Paris.
