= Barentin =

- Commune
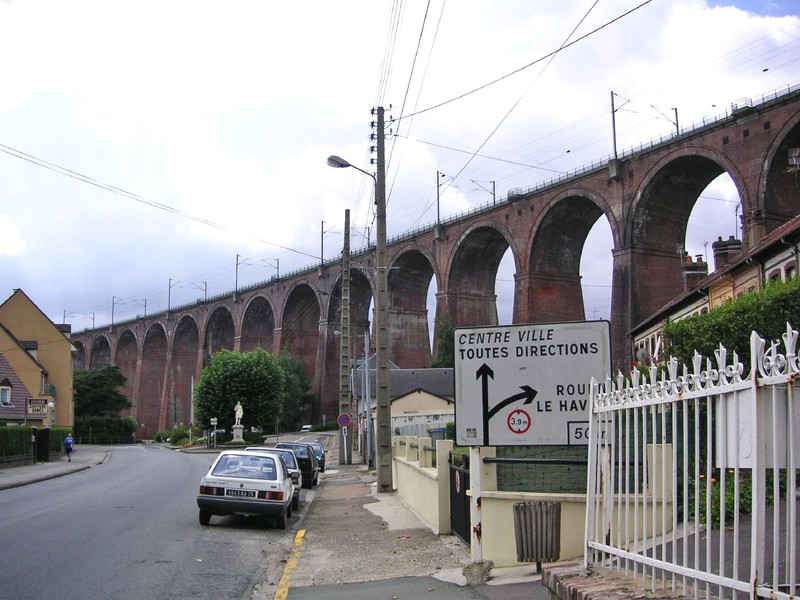
- Viaduct

- Coat of arms
- Location of Barentin
- Location within France Location within Normandy
- Coordinates: 49°33′N 0°57′E
- Country: France
- Region: Normandy
- Department: Seine-Maritime
- Arrondissement: Rouen
- Canton: Barentin

Government
  - Mayor (2026–32): Christophe Bouillon
- Area^{1}: 12.74 km^{2} (4.92 sq mi)
- Elevation: 75 m (246 ft)
- Highest elevation: 128 m (420 ft)
- Lowest elevation: 30 m (98 ft)
- Population (2023): 12,022
  - Density: 943.6/km^{2} (2,444/sq mi)
- Time zone: UTC+01:00 (CET)
  - Summer (DST): UTC+02:00 (CEST)
- INSEE/Postal code: 76057 /76360
- ^{1} French Land Register data, which excludes lakes, ponds, glaciers > 1 km^{2} (0.386 sq mi or 247 acres) and river estuaries.

Barentin (French pronunciation: [baʁɑ̃tɛ̃]) is a commune in the Seine-Maritime department in the Normandy region in northern France.

== Geography ==
The town is situated in the valley of the Austreberthe, a small affluent of the Seine. It is a town of light industry and farming situated by the banks of the river Austreberthe in the Pays de Caux, some 10 miles (16 km) northwest of Rouen at the junction of the D6015, D143 and the D104 roads. SNCF operates a TER rail service here.

== Heraldry ==
Arms of Barentin	The arms of Barentin are blazoned : Azure, a viaduct argent masonned sable, and in chief 3 bees Or.

== Population ==
Historical population
Year	Pop.	±% p.a.
1968	9,790	—
1975	10,773	+1.38%
1982	12,364	+1.99%
1990	12,721	+0.36%
1999	12,836	+0.10%
2007	12,291	−0.54%
2012	12,175	−0.19%
2017	11,822	−0.59%
2023	12,022	+0.28%
Source: INSEE

== Places of interest ==
- The church of St.Martin, dating from the nineteenth century.
- A museum.
- A seventeenth century fountain on the town square.
- More than 200 statues in the town, by Rodin, Janniot, Bourdelle, Drivier, Frémiet, Lagriffoul, etc.
- The railway viaduct, constructed in 1847 by Joseph Locke, with 27 arches 33m high.
- The sixteenth century chapel of Saint-Hélier.

== Notable people ==
- André Marie, politician (1897–1974)
- Père Jacques (born Lucien Bunel), (1900–1945), priest of the Carmelite Order, Righteous Among the Nations

== International relations ==
Barentin is twinned with:

- Petersfield, Hampshire in the United Kingdom
- Warendorf in Germany
- Castiglione delle Stiviere in Italy
- Brossard, Quebec in Canada

== See also ==
- Communes of the Seine-Maritime department
