= Rives-en-Seine =

- Commune
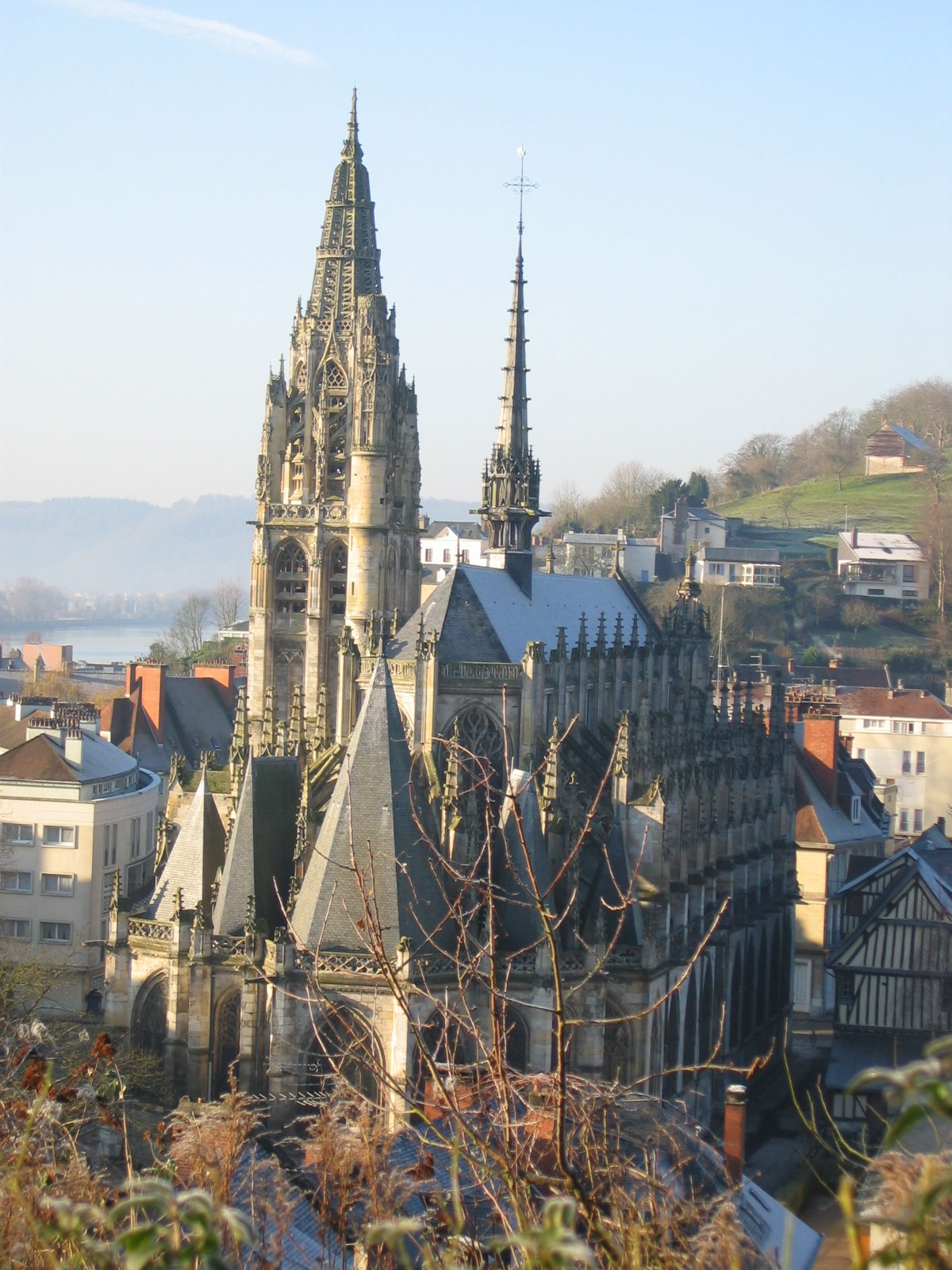
- The church in Caudebec
- Location of Rives-en-Seine
- Location within France Location within Normandy
- Coordinates: 49°31′30″N 0°43′23″E
- Country: France
- Region: Normandy
- Department: Seine-Maritime
- Arrondissement: Rouen
- Canton: Port-Jérôme-sur-Seine
- Intercommunality: Caux Seine Agglo

Government
  - Mayor (2026–32): Bastien Coriton
- Area^{1}: 34.14 km^{2} (13.18 sq mi)
- Population (2023): 4,002
  - Density: 117.2/km^{2} (303.6/sq mi)
- Time zone: UTC+01:00 (CET)
  - Summer (DST): UTC+02:00 (CEST)
- INSEE/Postal code: 76164 /76490
- ^{1} French Land Register data, which excludes lakes, ponds, glaciers > 1 km^{2} (0.386 sq mi or 247 acres) and river estuaries.

Rives-en-Seine (French pronunciation: [ʁiv ɑ̃ sɛn]) is a commune in the department of Seine-Maritime, northern France. The municipality was established on 1 January 2016 by merger of the former communes of Caudebec-en-Caux, Saint-Wandrille-Rançon and Villequier.

== Population ==
Population data refer to the area corresponding with the commune as of January 2025.

Historical population
Year	Pop.	±% p.a.
1968	4,722	—
1975	4,742	+0.06%
1982	4,430	−0.97%
1990	4,238	−0.55%
1999	4,322	+0.22%
2007	4,264	−0.17%
2012	4,213	−0.24%
2017	4,259	+0.22%
2023	4,002	−1.03%
Source: INSEE

== See also ==
- Communes of the Seine-Maritime department
