= Lesguillon =

Lesguillon is a surname. Notable people with the surname include:

- Hermance Lesguillon (1800–1882), French poet and novelist
- Jean-Pierre Lesguillon (1800–1873), French poet, novelist, playwright and librettist
