= La Lanterne =

La Lanterne may refer to:

- La Lanterne (Versailles) a residence of the president of France in Versailles
- La Lanterne magique (magazine)

== See also ==
- À la lanterne, French word and French Revolution slogan
- La Lanterne, Versailles
- La Lanterne-et-les-Armonts, French commune
