= Charles Rabou =

French writer, novelist and journalist

- Born: Charles Félix Henri Rabou; 6 September 1803; Paris
- Died: 1 February 1871 (aged 67); Paris
- Occupations: Writer, journalist

Charles Félix Henri Rabou (6 September 1803 – 1 February 1871) was a 19th-century French writer, novelist and journalist.

== Biography ==
The son of a military sub-intendant, he studied at the collège Henri IV before attending law classes at the Faculty of Dijon. Back in Paris with his degree in law, he turned away from the bar in favor of literature. First a journalist for La Quotidienne, Le Messager des Chambres, Le Nouvelliste, le Journal de Paris, La Charte de 1830, he held political and literary chronicles, then in 1832 launched La Cour d'Assise, to be published until 1834.

== Publication de Balzac ==
Director of the prestigious Revue de Paris which he helped establish, he befriended Honoré de Balzac whose novels he published in the pages of his paper. Mutual trust was such that Balzac entrusted him with the task to complete some unfinished novels after his death: Le Député d'Arcis (1854), Le Comte de Sallenauve (1855), La Famille Beauvisage (1855), Les Petits Bourgeois (1856), a task Rabou performed honestly but that was coldly greeted by the critics.

He was falsely accused of being Balzac's ghostwriter. Charles Rabou continued to produce great works of literature that deserve to be rediscovered.

== Works ==
=== Collections ===
- 1832: Contes bruns (with Honoré de Balzac and Philarète Chasles):
  - Sara la danseuse
  - Tobias Guarnerius
  - Les Regrets
  - Le Ministère public

=== Novels ===
- 1831: Le Mannequin (1831)
- 1839: Les Tribulations et métamorphoses posthumes de maître Fabricius, peintre liégeois (reprinted in 1860)
- 1840: Louison d'Arquien
- 1842: Le Capitaine Lambert
- 1845: La Reine d'un jour
- 1846: Madame de Chaumergis
- 1845: L'Allée des veuves
- 1849: Le Cabinet noir. Les Frères de la mort
- 1857: La Fille sanglante
- 1858: Le Marquis de Vulpiano
- 1860: Les Grands danseurs du Roi

=== Continuation of Balzac ===
- 1854: Scènes de la vie politique. Le Député d'Arcis
- 1854: Le Comte de Sallenauve
- 1855: La Famille Beauvisage
- 1855: Les Petits bourgeois, scènes de la vie parisienne

=== Historical essay ===
- 1860: La Grande Armée

== Bibliography ==
- Charles Rabou on wikisource
- Jacques Goimard et Roland Stragliati (éds.), Histoires de fantômes, éd. Presses Pocket, 1977
- Jacques Goimard et Roland Stragliati (éds.), La Grande Anthologie du fantastique, t.2, éd. Omnibus, 1996
- Florian Balduc (éd.),Fantaisies Hoffmaniennes, Editions Otrante, 2016
