= Jean-Joseph Ader =

French playwright (1796–1859)

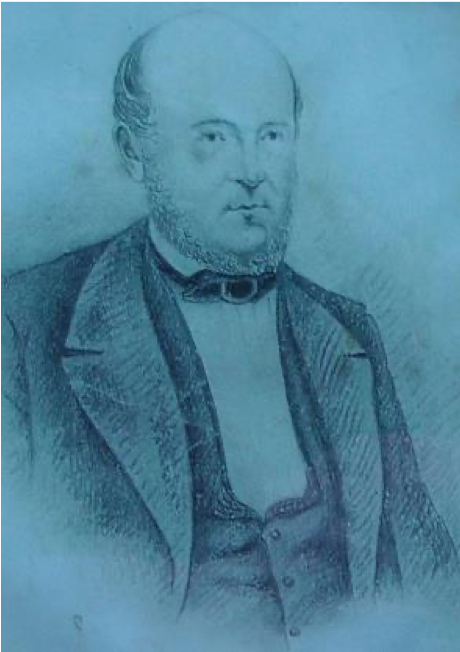
- Born: 16 October 1796; Ustaritz
- Died: 12 April 1859 (aged 62); Bassussarry castle near Ustaritz
- Occupations: Playwright, historian, writer

Jean-Joseph Ader (16 October 1796 – 12 April 1859) was a 19th-century French playwright, writer and historian.

== Biography ==
Ader studied in a seminary of the Basque country and arrived in Paris in 1813 where he studied medicine and law.

He began his literary career by collaborating with the Diable boiteux, the Frondeur, the Pandore and the Mercure du XIXe siècle. His articles earned him many problems with the police court. In 1826, he was sentenced to five days in jail against three months required for the anonymous article Robin des bois in the Frondeur which was assigned to him. He then moved to Belgium where he founded the Constitutionnel des Pays-Bas with Pierre François Tissot, another quickly banned newspaper.

In July 1830, he was among the three hundred journalists and writers who wrote calls to insurrection to achieve the abdication of Charles X's monarchy.

His plays were given at the Théâtre de l'Odéon, the Théâtre de la Porte-Saint-Martin and the most important Parisian stages of his times.

== Works ==
- 1817: Traité du mélodrame, with Abel Hugo and Armand Malitourne
- 1824: Ludovic Sforce, tragedy in 5 acts
- 1825: Les Deux écoles, ou le Classique et le romantique, comedy in 3 acts and in verse, (with Joseph-Léonard Detcheverry
- 1826: Résumé de l'histoire du Béarn, de la Gascogne supérieure et des Basques
- 1826: Napoléon devant ses contemporains
- 1826: Histoire de L’expédition d’Égypte et de Syrie, with Charles Théodore Beauvais de Préau
- 1826: L'Actrice, ou les Deux portraits, comedy in 1 act and in verse, with Louis Marie Fontan
- 1827: Le Cachemire, comedy in 1 act and in verse, with Édouard d'Anglemont
- 1827: Petit rocher de Cancale
- 1828: Les Suites d'un coup d'épée, one-act comedy in prose, with Émile Brousse
- 1828: Plutarque des Pays-Bas, ou Vies des hommes illustres de ce royaume
- 1829: La Bossue, ou, Le Jour de La Majorit, one-act comedy in verse, with Fontan
- 1829: Gillette de Narbonne, ou le Mari malgré lui anecdote du XVe siècle, comédie-vaudeville in 3 acts, with Fontan and Charles Desnoyer
- 1830: Jeanne la Folle, ou, La Bretagne au XIIIe siècle, historical drama in 5 acts, in verse, with Fontan and Alfred de Rhéville)
- 1832: Le Barbier du Roi D'Aragon, with Louis Marie Fontan and Louis Alexandre Piccinni
- 1834: L'Angélus, opéra comique in 1 act, music by Casimir Gide
- 1839: L'Oncle modèle, vaudeville in 1 act
- 1839: Deux Normands, vaudeville in 1 act
- Folle qui se désole, romance, with Fontan and Desnoyer
- L'enfance d’Henri IV, poetry
