= Abel Hugo =

French military officer

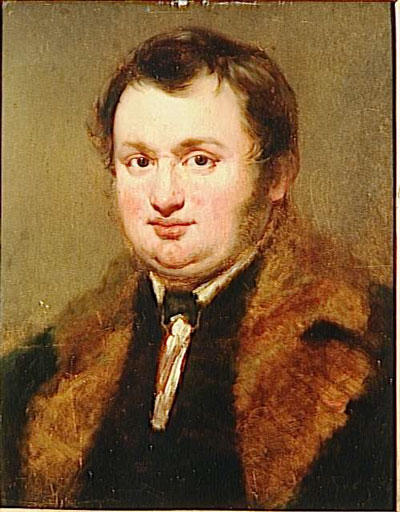
Abel Hugo (1830), by his wife, Julie Hugo

Abel Joseph Hugo (15 November 1798, in Paris – 7 February 1855, in Paris) was a French military officer, essayist, and historian. His younger brother was the novelist Victor Hugo.

== Biography ==
He was the eldest son of General Joseph Léopold Sigisbert Hugo and his wife, the artist Sophie Trébuchet. He attended the Lycée Impérial in Paris. At the age of thirteen, he entered the school for pages of Joseph Bonaparte, who was then King of Spain. He would be the only French page at the Spanish Court. While serving in that capacity, he began to practice his writing skills.

He took part in the French retreat of 1812, and served as a second lieutenant. Two years later, the Comte d’Artois (who would later become King Charles X), made him and his brothers Knights in the Order of The Lily; in recognition of the role their mother had played in supporting the Malet Coup. From then until 1818, he worked with the French General Staff. In 1819, he helped his brothers Victor and Eugène establish Le Conservateur littéraire, a Royalist literary magazine. He was mainly responsible for administration and distribution.

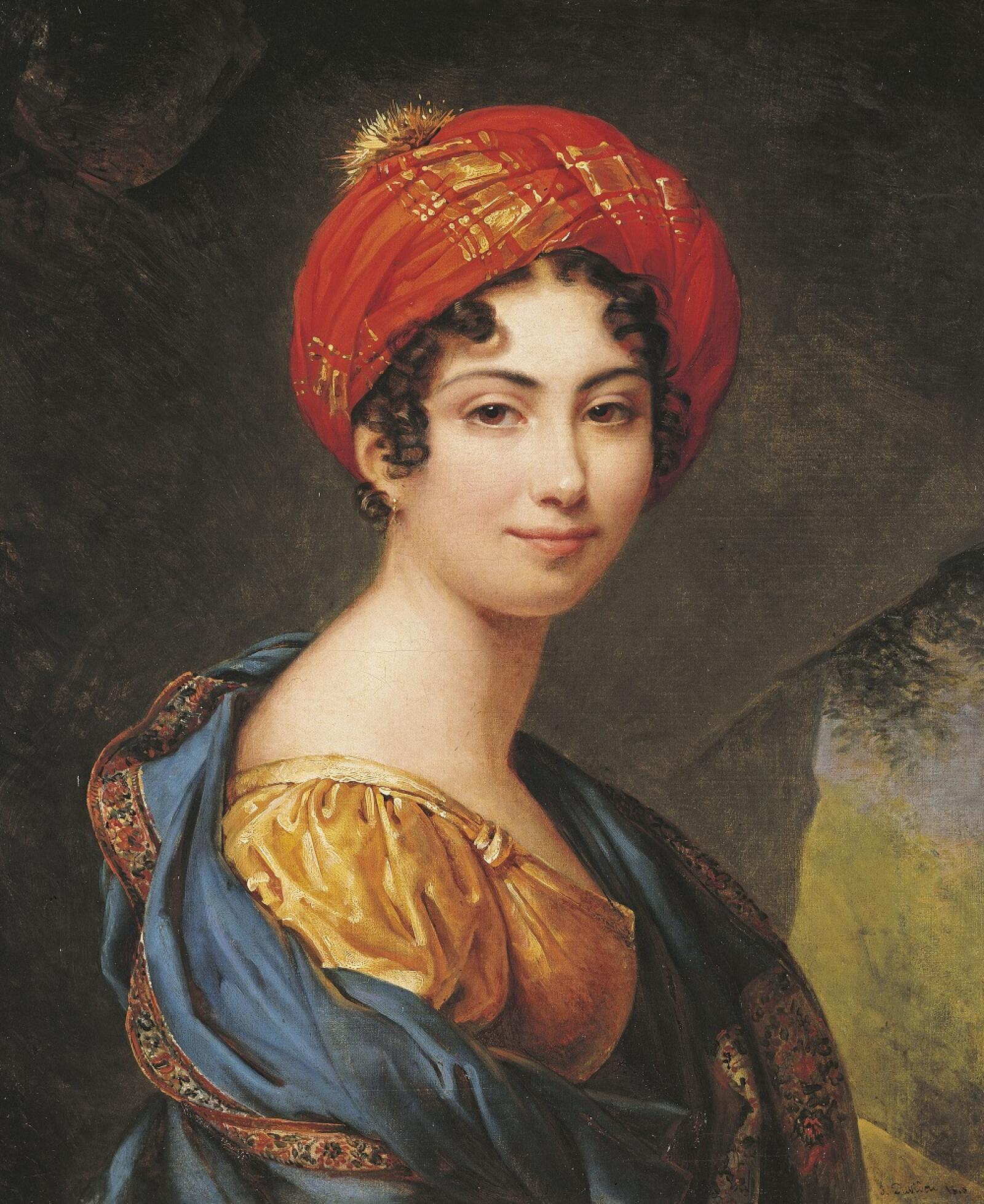
Louise Rose Julie Duvidal de Montferrier, self-portrait

In 1827, he married Louise Rose Julie Duvidal de Montferrier, an artist, who had studied with Jacques-Louis David. She was the daughter of Jean-Jacques Duvidal de Montferrier, second Marquis de Montferrier. They had two sons; Léopold Armand (1828-1895), a graphic designer, and Joseph Napoléon (1835-1863), a Jesuit priest. Initially, Victor distrusted her, and warned Abel against marrying her, but later came to hold her in esteem. Upon his father's death, in 1828, he became "Count Hugo".

A strong supporter of Monarchism, he abandoned his Legitimist positions around 1833; a time that corresponds to the writing of his two major works on Napoleon and the French military. In addition to his published works, he contributed to the Revue des deux Mondes, as well as the military periodicals Le Spectateur militaire and the Journal de l’Armée. From 1835 to 1843, he published three multi-volume histories of France. He was a member of several literary societies.

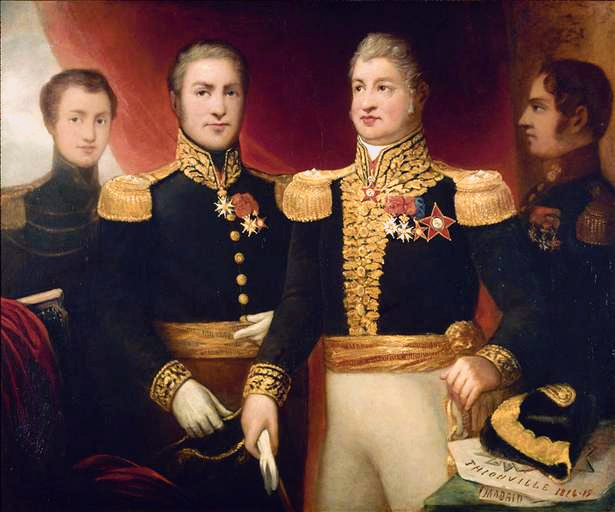
Abel Hugo (left), with his father, General Hugo, flanked by two of his uncles (Julie Hugo, 1820s)

== Selected works ==
- Traité du mélodrame, with Armand Malitourne and Jean-Joseph Ader, Delaunay, Pélicier et Plancher, Paris, 1817 (Online)
- Histoire de la campagne d’Espagne en 1823, 2 volumes, Paris, Lefuel, 1824 et 1825 (Vol.I) (Vol.II)
- France pittoresque, ou Description pittoresque, topographique et statistique des départements et colonies de la France, Delloye éditeur, 3 vol., Paris, 1835 (Vol.I) (Vol.III)
- Histoire générale de France, depuis les temps les plus reculés jusqu’à nos jours, H.-L. Delloye, 5 vol. Paris, 1836-1843 (Vol.I) (Vol.II) (Vol.V)
- France militaire, Histoire des armées françaises de terre et de mer, de 1792 à 1837, H.-L. Delloye, Paris, 1838 (Vol.II) (Vol.IV) (Vol.V)
