= Château de Saint-Just =

Renaissance castle in Normandy, France

Coordinates: 49°06′39″N 1°25′53″E

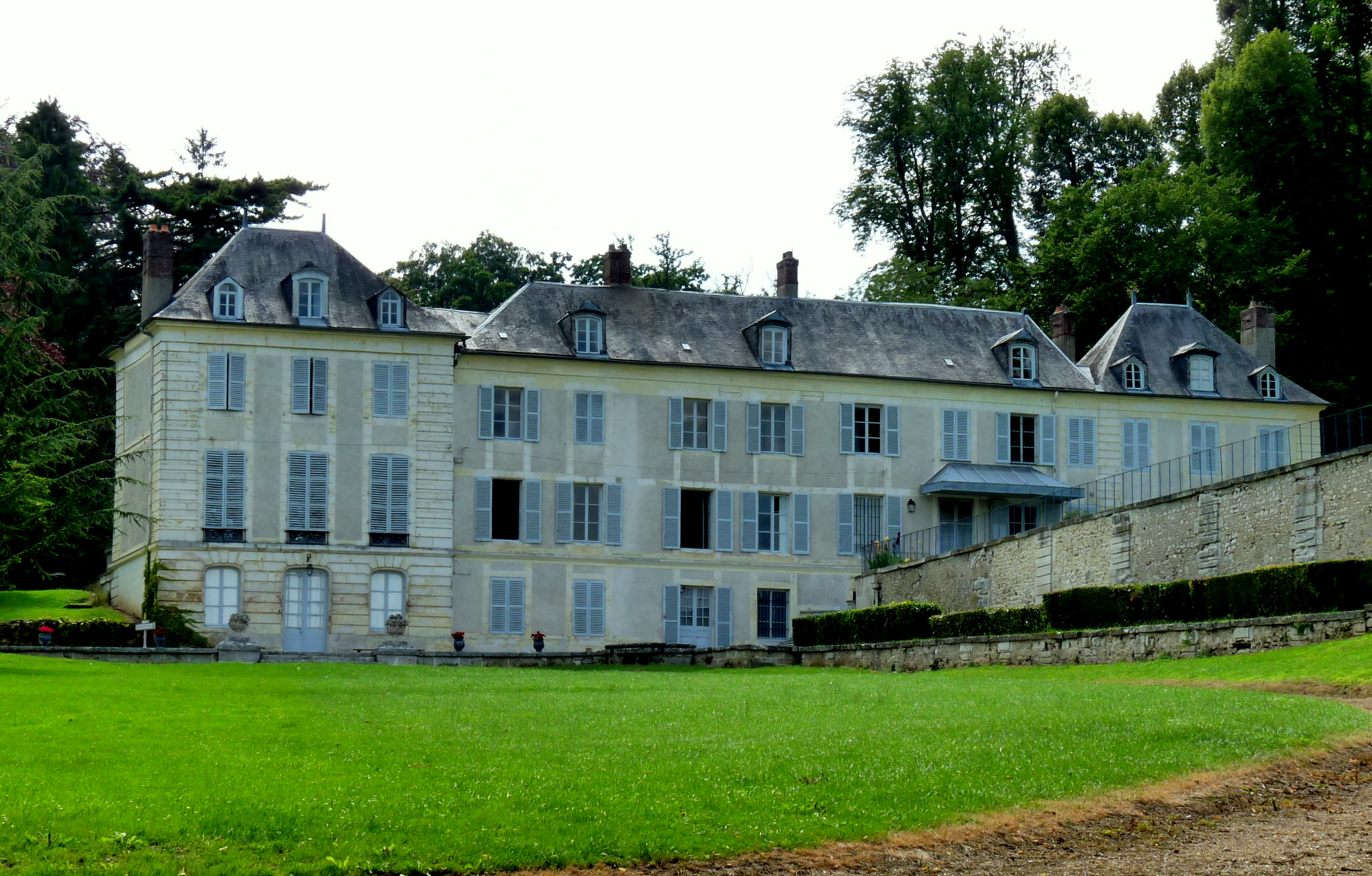
Façade of the Château de Saint-Just

The Château de Saint-Just is a Renaissance castle with a park located in the Commune of Saint-Just near the town of Vernon in the Eure Department, in the region of upper Normandy, France. It was classified as an historic monument of France in 1995. The park is classified by the Committee of Parks and Gardens of the French Ministry of Culture as one of the Remarkable Gardens of France. The park is open to the public on certain hours from June first until August 1.

== History ==
The first chateau was built in the 13th century, but only a few foundations remain. Near the end of the 16th century, Jacques de Croixmare built a new residence on the site. A record of the property in the fief of Saint-Just, written in 1608, mentions a manor, common buildings, an orangery, a garden and a kitchen garden. It also included a chapel, two mills, vineyards, and an avenue planted with elm trees.

In 1654 the last descendants of the Croixmare family sold the house to Jean de Savary, the Secretary to the King of France and the Master of the Waters and Forests of Normandy. Jean de Savary and his descendants transformed the park into a French formal garden, adding water features and a kitchen garden. A plan from 1744 shows the chateau and park as they looked in the 18th century.

In 1775 the chateau was sold to the Duke de Penthièvre, who also owned the nearby château de Bizy. The Duke turned the old lodging into a rest home for his elderly servants. In the park, he constructed a dairy and an icehouse, as well as a clinic. The rest home was occupied until the death of the Duke in 1793. The house was nationalized during the French Revolution and then sold to Sébastien-Gilles Huet de Guerville. He built a tomb for his wife in the park, using architectural elements of the mausoleum of Lancelot de la Garenne (1595), coming from the church of the village of Mercey, Eure.

In 1798, the chateau was purchased by Victor Claude Alexandre Fanneau de Lahorie, one of Napoleon's generals, who later was implicated in a plot against Napoleon and shot in 1812. During the time he owned the house his mistress was Sophie Trébuchet, the mother of Victor Hugo, and according to some accounts Victor Hugo may have been conceived at the chateau.

In 1805 de Lahorie sold the chateau to Chevalier Suchet, who sold it to his brother, the Marshal and Duke d'Albufera. Louis Gabriel Suchet, who was one of Napoleon Bonaparte's most famous marshals, celebrated for his victories in Spain. In 1810 Suchet replaced the elm trees of the avenue from the 17th century with poplar trees. Beginning in 1816, he made major transformations on the house, done by the architect Lacornée. He redecorated and refurnished the house in the French Empire style, and had the park redesigned by the landscape architect Belguise. In 1825, part of the park was transformed into an English garden.

After the death of the Marshal in 1826, his widow divided the property and sold a part, including the chapel, the Osmont pavilion, the clinic and part of the English garden to the owner of the neighboring chateau du Rocher.

The chateau has belonged to the same family since 1885. In 1893, the avenue was replanted with plane trees. In 1905, the pond was restored, and the water garden features repaired in 1935. The left wing of the house was torn down in 1904. A large section of the original park now belongs to an adjoining property.

== The Park ==
The park is connected to the Seine River by an avenue more than a kilometre long lined by two rows of London plane trees. The most striking feature of the park is the water garden, created in the 17th century. Three channels of water flow from springs downhill into a large pond, which reflects the façade of the chateau. The terraces of the park overlook the kitchen garden, also irrigated by the spring water, and over the Seine. The 19th-century section of the park has a remarkable assortment of old oak and baldcypress trees.

== Bibliography ==
- Philippe Thébaud and Christian Maillard, Parcs et Jardins en France, Rivages, 2008. (ISBN 978-2-7436-1818-6)
