= Armand Malitourne =

French literary critic (1796–1866)

- Born: Pierre-Armand Malitourne; 19 July 1796; L'Aigle (Orne)
- Died: 19 April 1866 (aged 69); Paris
- Occupations: Journalist, critic, writer

Pierre-Armand Malitourne (19 July 1796 – 19 April 1866) was a 19th-century French journalist, literary critic and writer.

== Biography ==
After he studied at the college of Alençon, he moved to Paris in 1816. In 1819, he obtained a prize from the Académie française for his book Éloge de Lesage and made his debut at La Quotidienne where he published articles on a regular basis. Under the Ministry Martignac, he participated to Le Messager des Chambres then, after the July Revolution of 1830, became editor at La Charte de 1830. He also collaborated to the Moniteur parisien, the Messager, the Constitutionnel, the Nouvelles à la main (1841), the Revue de Paris and L'Artiste.

He was made chevalier of the Légion d'honneur (1828)

He is buried at Père Lachaise Cemetery.

== Works ==
- 1817: Traité du mélodrame, with Jean-Joseph Ader and Abel Hugo
- 1819: Éloge de Lesage
- 1820: Des résolutions militaires et de la charte
- 1820: De l'Éloquence de la tribune et du barreau
- 1827: Mémoires d'une contemporaine (under the pseudonym Madame Ida Saint-Elme) (8 vol. 1827)
- 1827: A mes amis Picard et Mazères, comedy
- 1856: Le Presbytère, with Nicolas Martin

In addition, he participated to the Dictionnaire de la conversation (1826). He also published an edition of œuvres choisies by Balzac (2 vol.1822) and Œuvres by Rivarol (1852).

== Bibliography ==
- Obituary in the Journal des Débats, 29 April 1866
- Gustave Vapereau, Dictionnaire Universel des contemporains, 1870, (p. 1045)
- Pierre Larousse, Grand dictionnaire universel du XIXe siècle, (p. 1019)
- Paul Bauer, 2 siècles d'histoire au Père Lachaise, 2006, (p. 520)
