= Jean-Pierre Lesguillon =

French poet, playwright, novelist and librettist

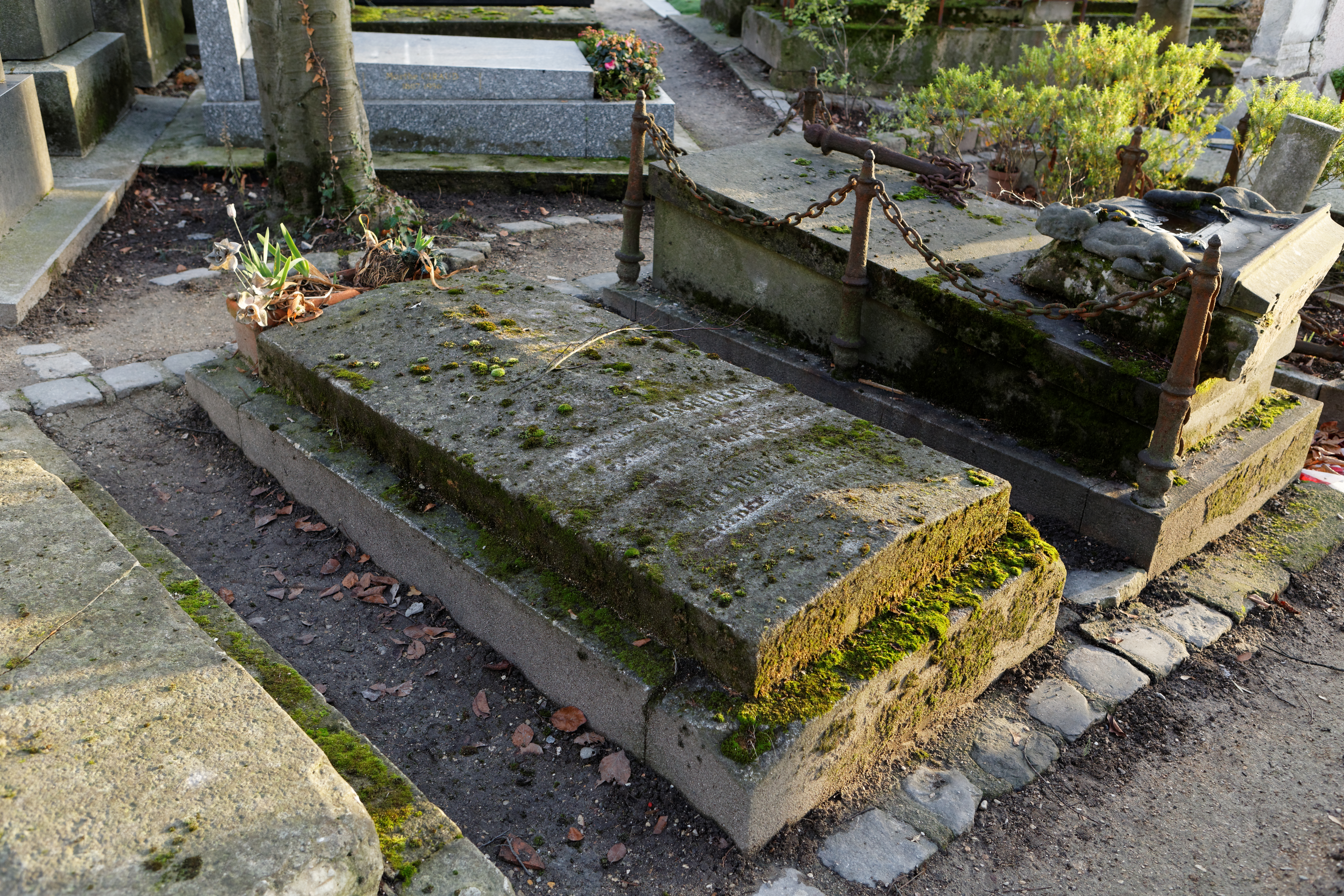
- Lesguillon's grave at Père Lachaise cemetery
- Born: 1800; Orléans
- Died: January 1873 (aged 72–73); Paris
- Spouse: Hermance Lesguillon

Jean-Pierre-François Lesguillon, (1800 – January 1873) was a 19th-century French poet, novelist, playwright and librettist.

Lesguillon wrote comédies en vaudeville, comedies and dramas, in prose and in verse, novels, and a great number of pieces in verse crowned at the floral games and in the competitions of all departmental academies.

In 1830 he succeeded Justin Gensoul at the head of the Almanach des Muses which he directed until 1833, the year when he started publishing the periodical La Lanterne magique.

His Épître à M. N.-L. Lemercier earned him three months' imprisonment and a 300 francs fine in 1826 for "Having insulted and mocked the religion of the State" and "directed attacks against the royal dignity."

He was the husband of writer Hermance Lesguillon. Both are buried at Père Lachaise Cemetery (49th division).

== Works ==
- Albéric, ou la Comédie de quinze ans;
- 1832: Aoust 1572, ou Charles IX à Orléans, historical drama in 4 acts, in verse, Paris, Panthéon, 20 November;
- À M. Henri de Longuève, conseiller d’État, député du Loiret;
- À nos amis Achille et Aglaé Comte;
- Biographie du citoyen Garnier-Pagès, par E. M....;
- Charles de Rivière, ode historique;
- Dieu et le diable;
- Dinaux;
- Écho du ciel;
- Émotions;
- Épître à M. N.-L. Lemercier;
- 1850: Figaro en prison, comedy in 1 act, in verse with L. Monrose... Paris, Français, 9 February;
- 1845: Hommage à Marceau, prononcé sur le théâtre de Chartres, 27 April;
- 1843: Hommage funèbre à Casimir Delavigne, speech delivered by Mr. Godat on the second Théâtre français, 20 December;
- Introduction;
- Couronnes académiques;
- Jacque et Jean, souvenir de Crimée, poem crowned by the Académie impériale de Metz in the solemn meeting of May 10, 1857;
- La Cachette, trilogie, avec prologue et épilogue;
- La Camaraderie dans les lettres et les arts, Mémoire couronné par l’Académie des sciences, belles-lettres et arts de Rouen, dans sa séance annuelle;
- La Colonne et le monument, ode historique lue à la Société des bonnes-lettres pour l’anniversaire du 21 janvier;
- 1836: La Cour des miracles, chronique de 1450, vaudeville in 2 acts, after The Hunchback of Notre-Dame, with Emmanuel Théaulon and René de Chazet, Paris, Porte Saint-Antoine, 31 December;
- La femme auteur;
- La Lanterne magique 1er–4e année;
- 1826: Le Cachemire, comedy in 1 act and in verse, with Édouard-J. Ader, Paris, Odéon, 16 December;
- Le Colon de Mettray, poème mentionné à l’Académie française, précédé d’un bouquet à Chloris;
- Le Conteur;
- 1848: Le Dernier Figaro, ou Cinq journées d’un siècle, comedy in prose and in 5 periods, Paris, Odéon, 8 February;
- 1833: Le Fils naturel, ou l’Insulte, drama in 3 acts, with Leroi, Paris, Gaieté, 11 August;
- Le Général Marceau, historical drama in 3 acts, mingle with songs, with Fabrice Labrousse, Paris, Porte Saint-Antoine;
- 1836: Le Jeton de Frascati, drama in 3 acts, Paris, Panthéon, 26 November;
- 1850: Le Maestro, ou la Renommée, opéra comique in 2 acts, lyrics by Lesguillon, Versailles, Théâtre, 19 November;
- 1852: Le Télescope, poem crowned by the Académie des Jeux floraux in Toulouse dans la séance du 3 May;
- Les Amis de César, comédie romaine;
- 1862: Les Deux Lièvres, comedy in 1 act, in verse, Paris, Odéon, 21 February;
- Les Deux Sœurs;
- Les Devoirs de l’homme de lettres au XIXe, poem;
- Les Souvenirs, poems by Eugène Mahon, intro. by M. J. Lesguillon;
- Marie Touchet, chronique orléanaise;
- 1832: Méphistophélès, drama in 3 acts and in verse, répété au Second-Théâtre français en 1829, arrêté par la censure la veille de la représentation and presented 7 April 1832;
- 1832: Méphistophélès, ou le Diable et la jeune fille, drama in 3 acts and in verse, Paris, Panthéon, 7 April;
- Monrose;
- 1839: Nanon, Ninon et Maintenon ou Les Trois Boudoirs, comédie en vaudeville in 3 acts, by Emmanuel Théaulon, Jean-Pierre Lesguillon and Achille d'Artois, Théâtre du Palais Royal, 22 March;
- Épître à M. le lieutenant-colonel Staaf sur la poésie française contemporaine;
- Rustaut à Paris, ou le Voyage politique;
- Schildine;
- Six Heures de février, cantata sung 29 February 1848;
- 1827: Tancredi, opera in 3 acts, lyrics by Édouard d'Anglemont [and Lesguillon], music by Rossini, arranged by M. Lemière de Corvey, Paris, Odéon, 7 September;
- Théâtre, précédé d’une notice;
- 1844: Tout pour de l’or, drama in 5 acts, including 1 prologue, with Dinaux, Paris, Gaieté, 17 June;
- 1834: Un caprice de femme, opéra comique in 1 act, music by Paër, Paris, Opéra-comique, 23 July;
- Un songe dans l’Attique, poem crowned by the Académie des Sciences, Belles-lettres et Arts de Bordeaux;
- Washington, historical drama.
