= Julie Hugo =

French painter

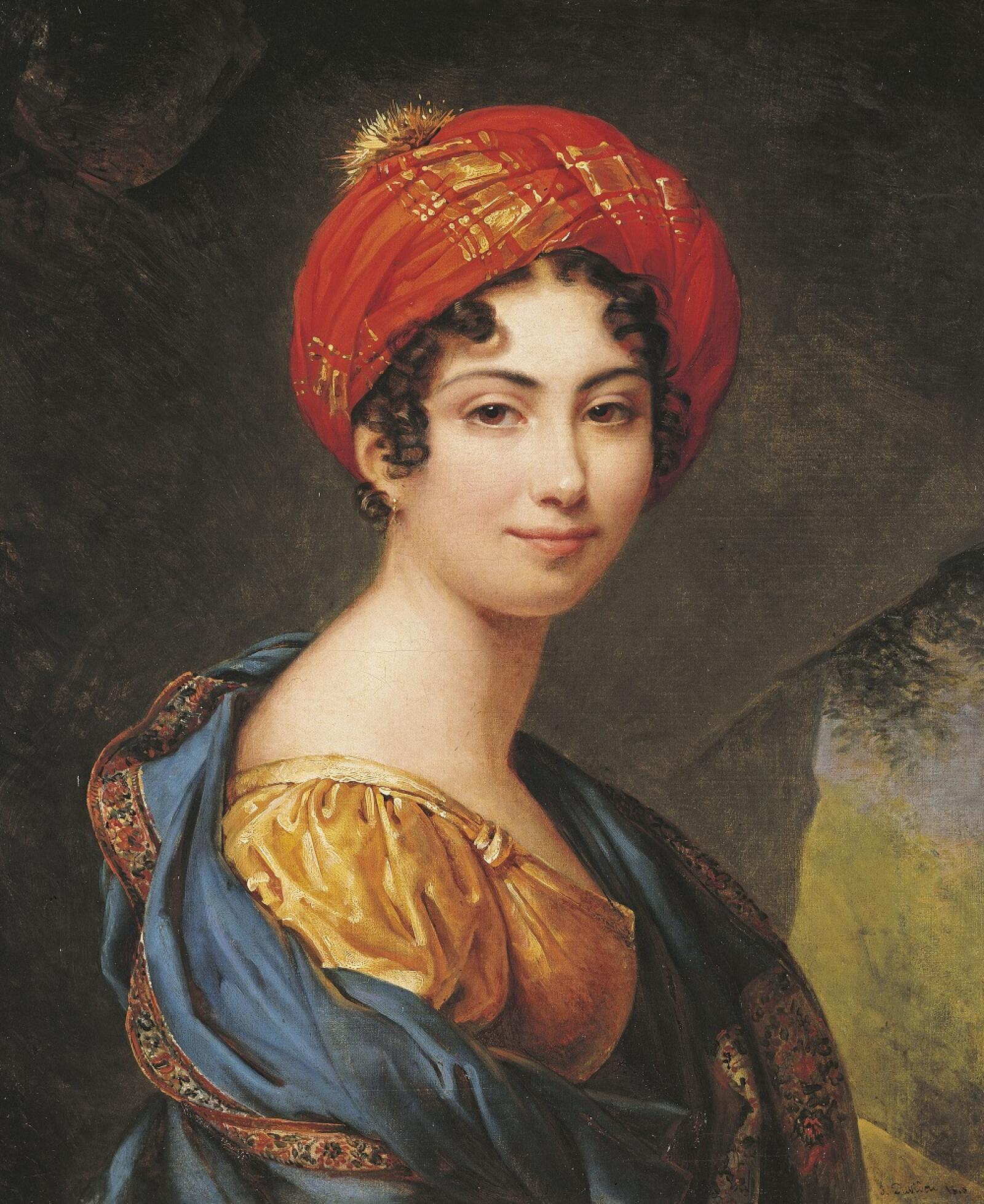
- Self-portrait
- Born: Louise Rose Julie Duvidal de Montferrier; 1797; Paris
- Died: 10 April 1865 (aged 67–68); Brussels
- Known for: Portraits, historical paintings
- Spouse: Abel Hugo

Julie Hugo (1797–1865; born Louise Rose Julie Duvidal de Montferrier) was a 19th-century French painter.

== Career ==
Hugo was born in Paris in 1797, daughter of Jean Jacques Duvidal de Montferrier (1752-1829) and Jeanne Delon (ca 1770-1831). As a young woman she was educated at Écouen under Madame Campan. She was a student of Jacques-Louis David, and later François Gérard and Marie-Éléonore Godefroid. She served as an official copyist of works by Ingres and Delacroix, and often copied works by her mentor Gérard for French institutions. Of her original works, many portraits and historical paintings were shown at the Salon from 1819 to 1827. She painted two mythological scenes to be hung above doors in the Château de Rambouillet; these headpieces are now kept in the Louvre. She has the distinction of being the only female artist to have a painting hanging in the French National Assembly This painting, The Vow of St. Clothilde (1819), has hung there for two centuries.

== Personal life ==
She was the art tutor for Adèle Foucher, the wife of Victor Hugo. At first Victor Hugo viewed Julie Hugo as a negative influence on Foucher, due to her role as an artist, but following her marriage to his older brother, Abel, they were eventually reconciled. Her marriage to Abel Hugo produced two children: Léopold Armand Hugo (1828–1895) and Joseph Napoléon Jules Hugo (1835–1863). She died in Brussels on 10 April 1865.

== Gallery ==
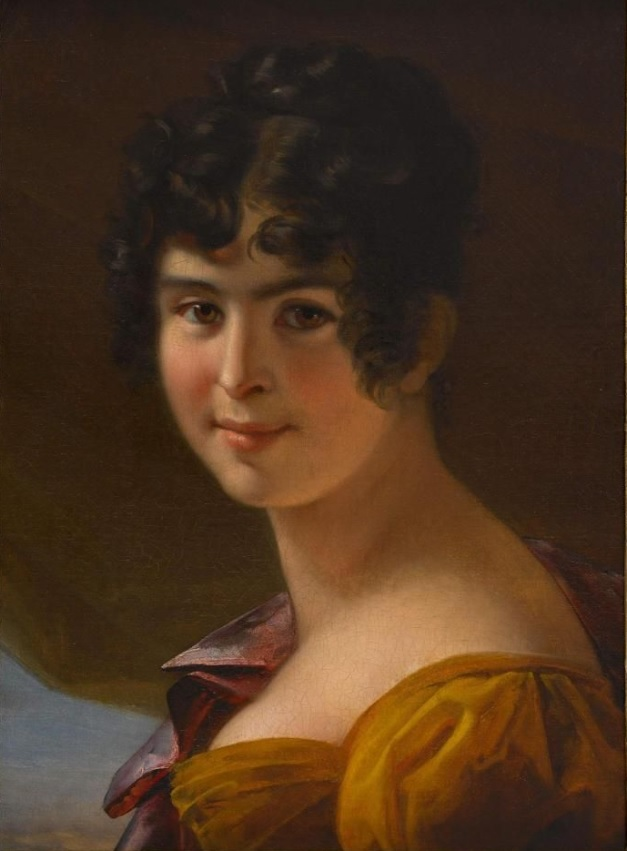
Adèle Foucher, 1822

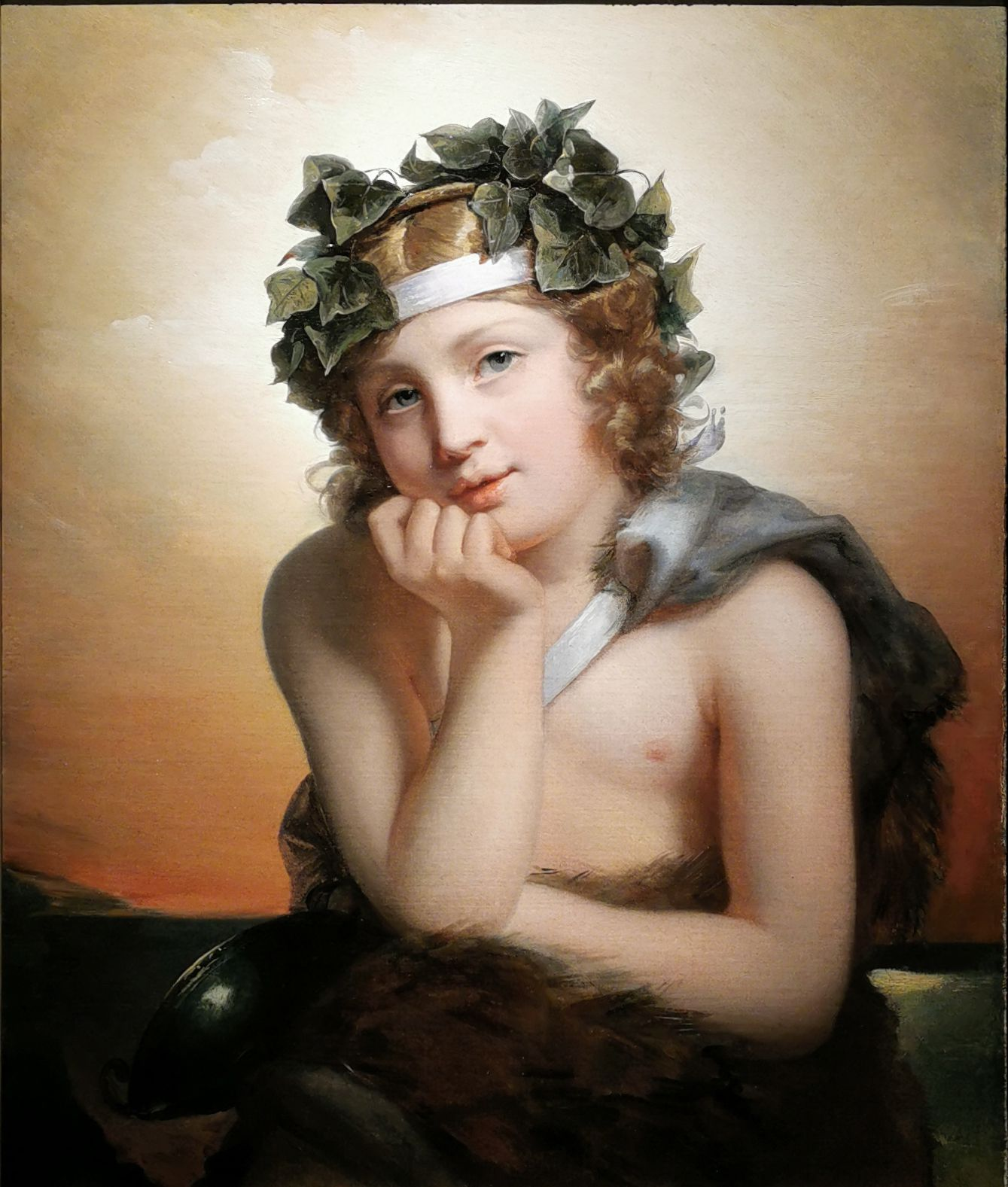
Bacchus as a child, 1822

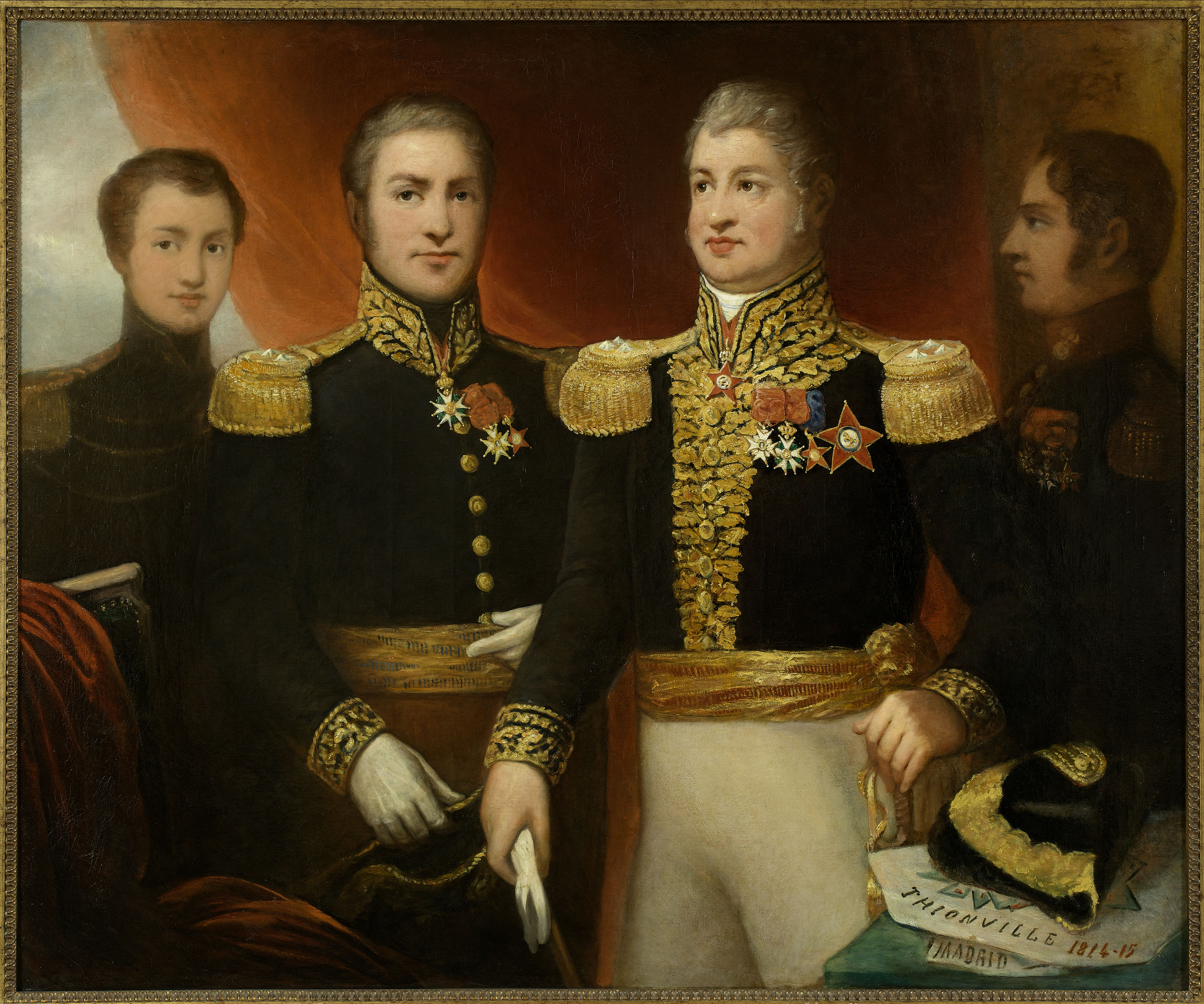
General Léopold Hugo, with two of his brothers and his son Abel in Restoration uniform, 1825

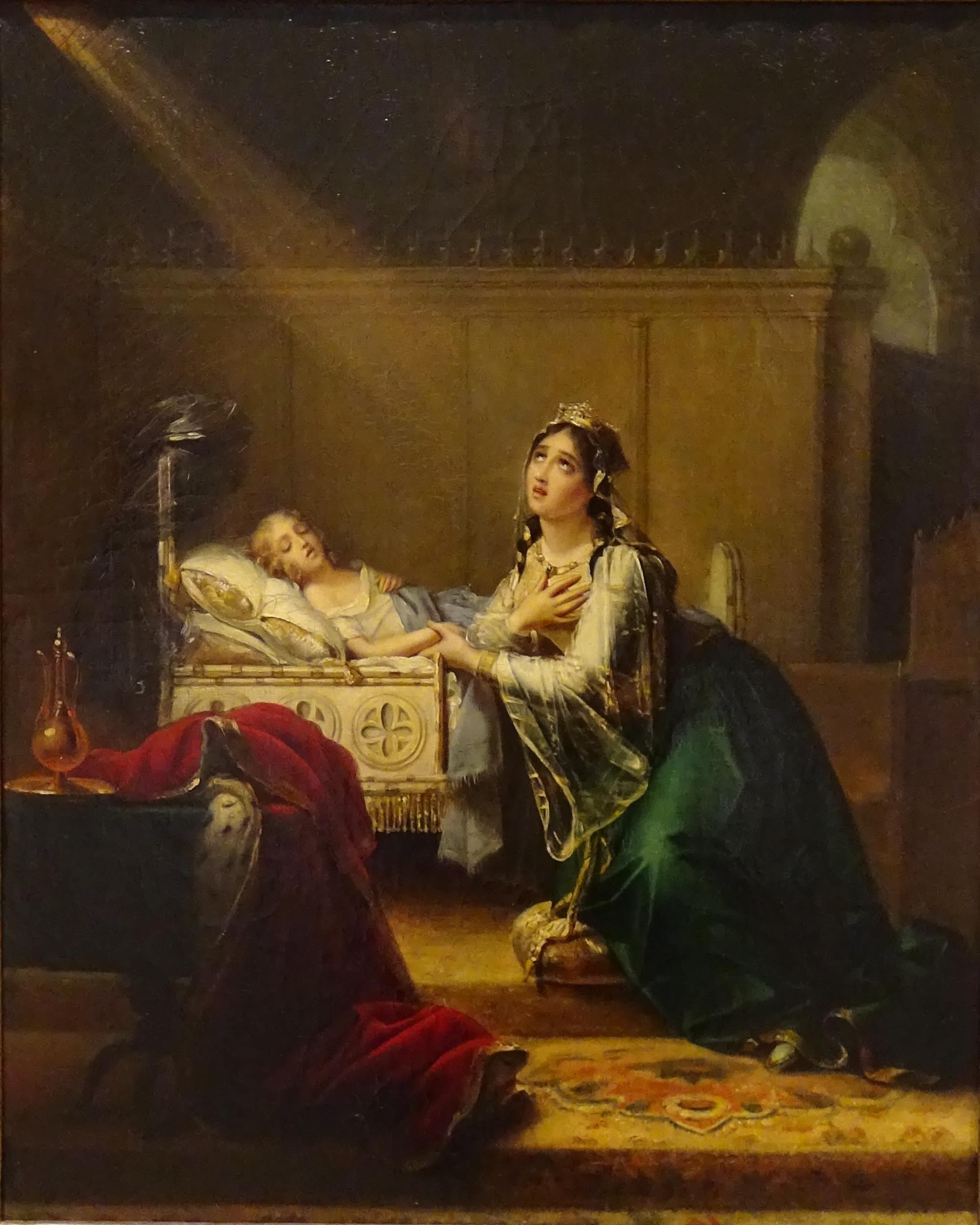
The Sick Child, or Clotilde asking for the healing of her son, 1819 or 1865

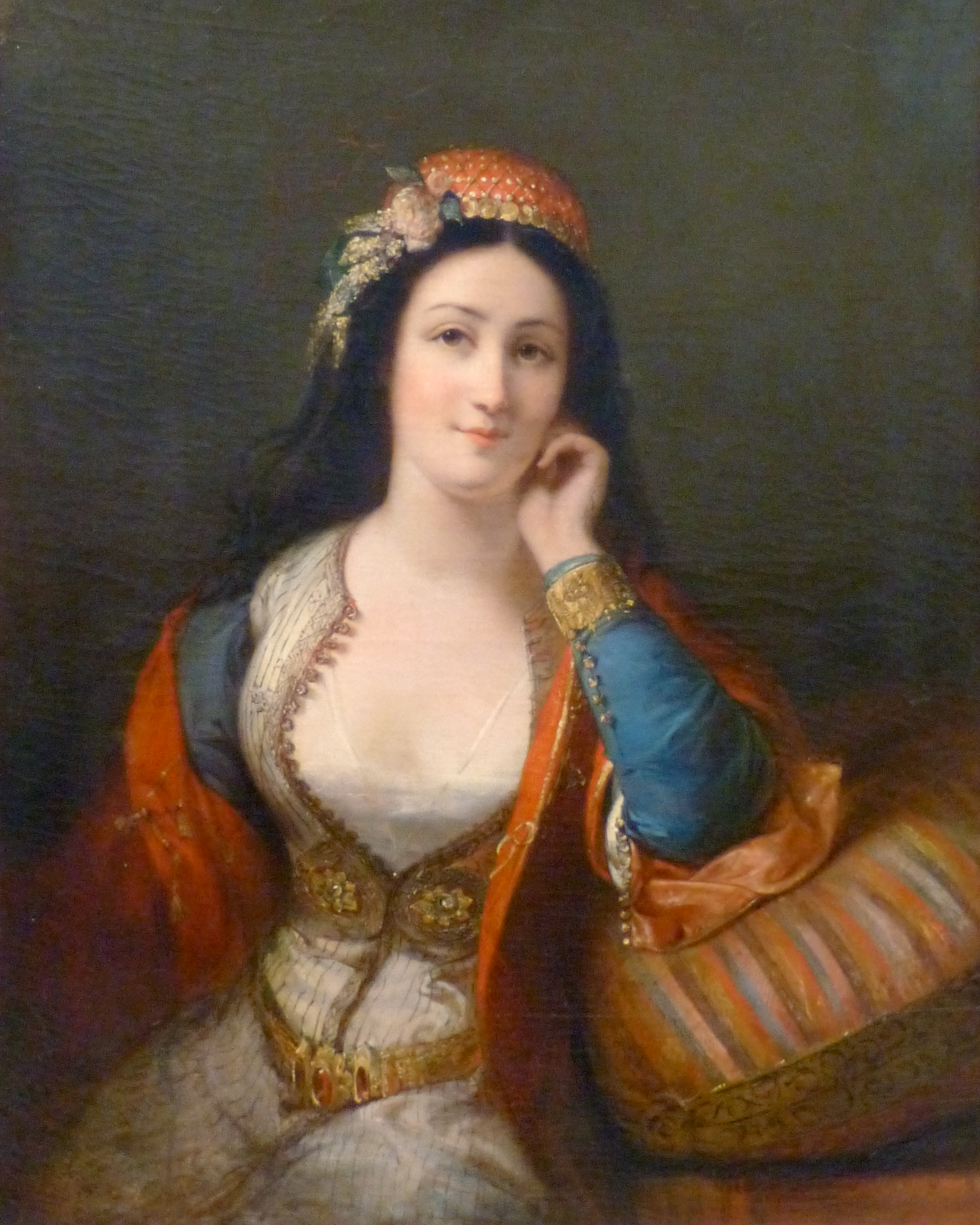
Greek Young Girl with Athens' Costume or Mrs Amédée Pichot, 1833

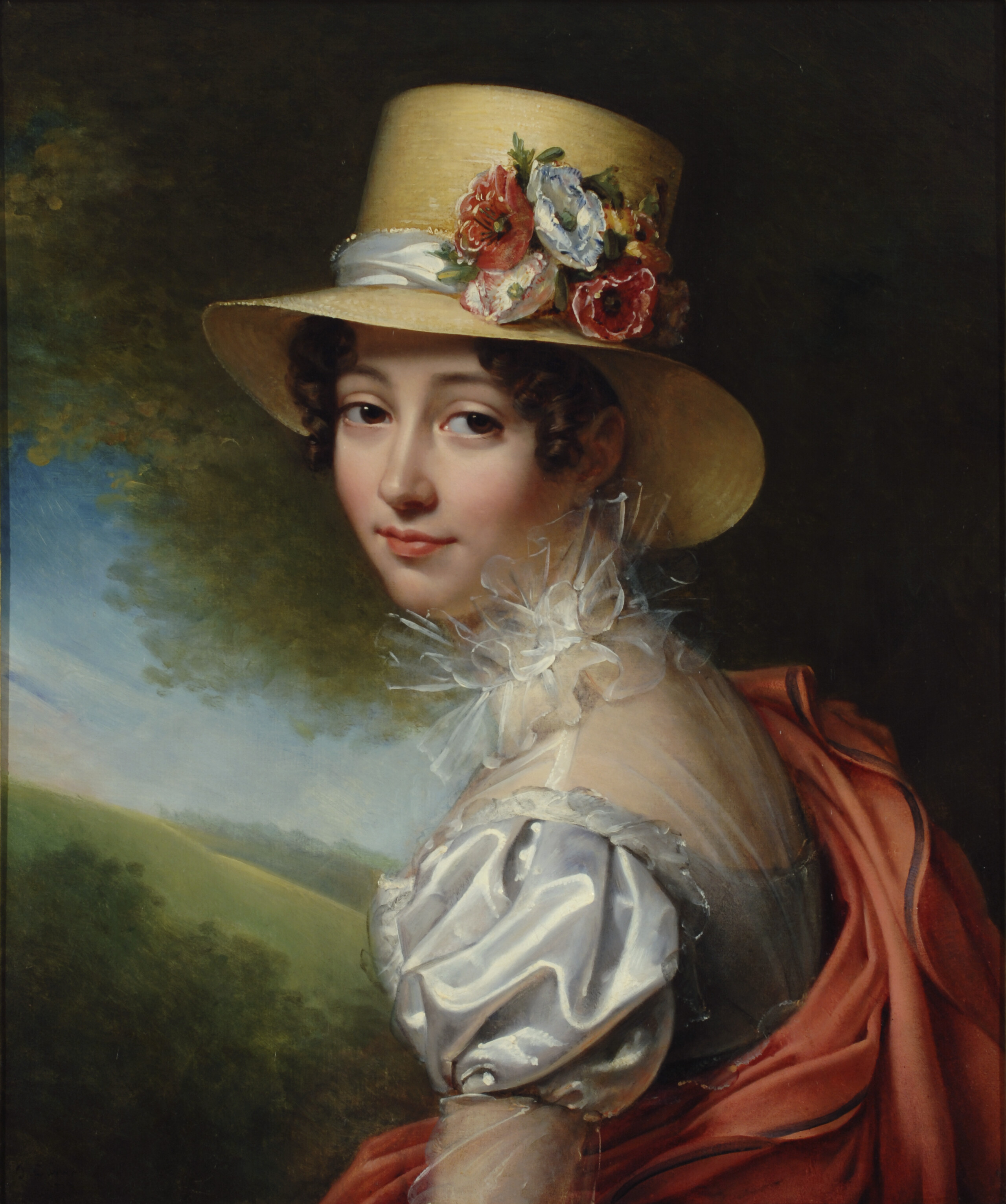
Portrait of Zoé Jacqueline Duvidal de Montferrier, the artist's sister, 1819
