= Sophie Trébuchet =

French painter (1772–1821)

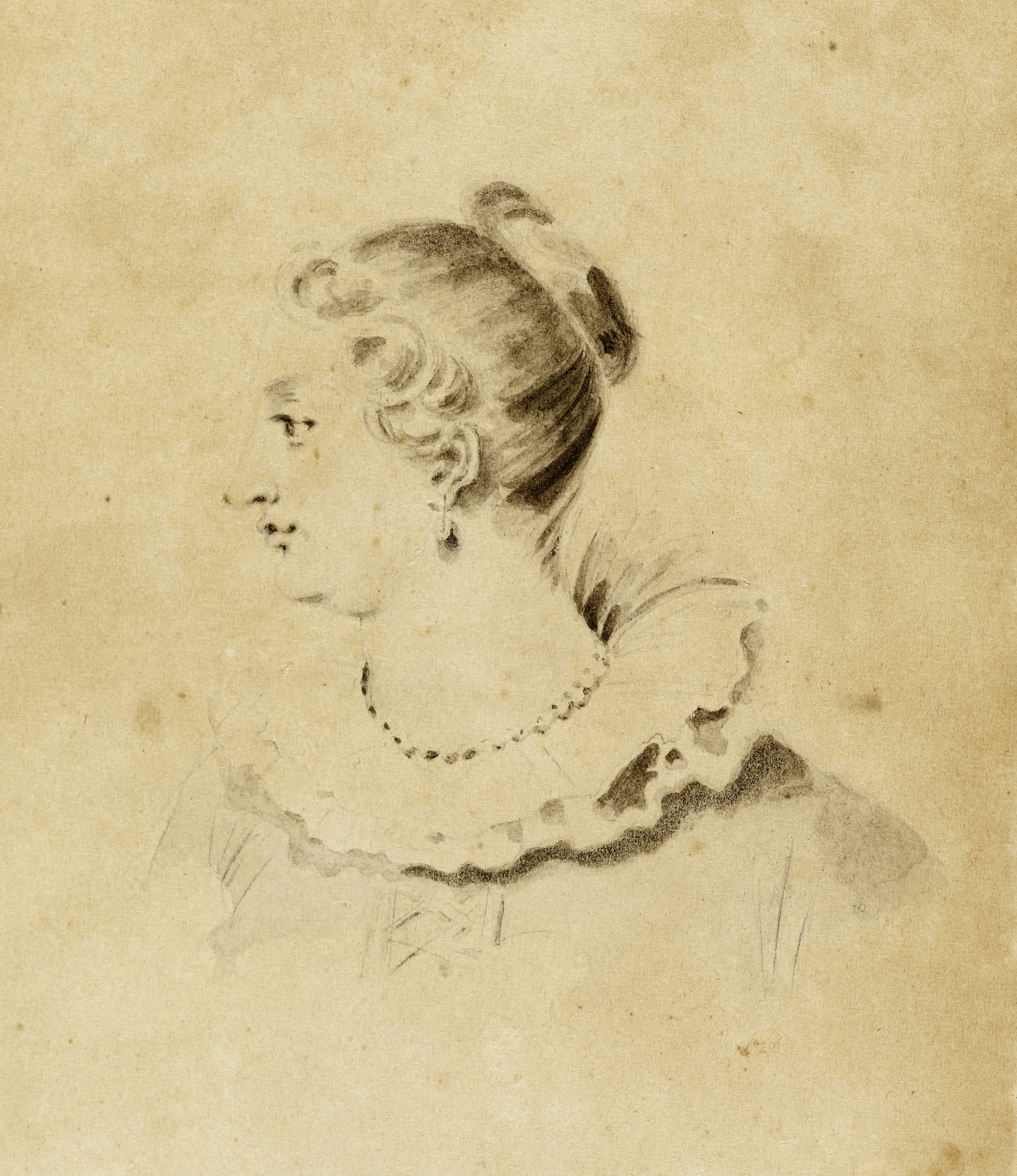
- Born: 19 June 1772; Nantes, France
- Died: 27 June 1821 (aged 49); Paris, France
- Occupation: Painter
- Spouse: Joseph Léopold Sigisbert Hugo
- Children: 3, including Abel and Victor

Sophie Françoise Trébuchet (19 June 1772 in Nantes – 27 June 1821 in Paris) was a French painter and the mother of Victor Hugo.

== Early life ==
Sophie Françoise Trébuchet was born on June 19, 1772, in Nantes, rue des Carmélites, the fourth of eight children. Her father, Jean-François Trébuchet, was captain of a ship, and her mother, Louise Le Normand (1748–1780), from Saint-Fiacre-sur-Maine, was the daughter of the seneschal Château-Thébaud. Some time after her birth, Trébuchet was baptized in the church of Saint-Laurent.

She became an orphan at the age of eight, when her mother died on August 14, 1780, three weeks after giving birth to her eighth child, who did not survive. Her father, in financial trouble, was forced to accept a mission in the Indian Ocean from shipowners in Brest. He auctioned off some of the couple's property in order to pay for the equipment of the ship "The Count of Grasse", and then embarked. He took care before his departure to place his seven surviving children in boarding school, while the two eldest went respectively to his nephew Louis Trébuchet and his sister-in-law Louise Mathurine Le Normand du Buisson. After the death of their father, the children were divided between the remaining family, while Trébuchet left her guardian, Menant-Dugué, to meet her paternal aunt, Françoise-Louise Trébuchet.

== The revolution ==
On July 18, 1789, Trébuchet attended the revolutionary riots in Nantes. She came to sympathize with the royalist cause after witnessing the execution of two young girls and their mother, Madame de La Biliais, whom she knew during her childhood. This episode remained in her memory for the rest of her life. During the Terror, sparked in Nantes by Jean-Baptiste Carrier, Trébuchet returned to Châteaubriant. But on February 11, 1796, she witnessed a battle in Grand-Auverné between Republicans and Chouans. The same year, she met Joseph Léopold Sigisbert Hugo in Châteaubriant, a Republican soldier with whom she fell in love. On November 15, 1797, they were married in Paris.

== Married life ==
The couple then moved to the Maison-Commune in Paris. Their first child, Abel Hugo, was born on November 15, 1798. While staying with the Hugo family, Trébuchet became pregnant a second time, and desired to return to Brittany, but her husband refused. Eugène Hugo was born on September 16, 1800, in Nancy, rue des Maréchaux. Léopold Hugo was appointed adjutant-general at Lunéville, where Trébuchet met Joseph Bonaparte. Later, the family went to Besançon, where, on February 26, 1802, Trébuchet's third child, Victor was born.

Léopold was then sent to Marseilles, where the rest of his family joined him. Once there, he sought a promotion and sent Trébuchet to Victor Fanneau de La Horie in Paris. She stayed in Paris, where she moved to the Hotel de Nantes, rue Neuve-des-Petits-Champs, where Victor Fanneau de La Horie was living. La Horie had been Sophie Trébuchet's lover for some time, and there is some speculation that he may have been Victor Hugo's father.

== Later life ==
In the beginning of 1803, Léopold went to Bastia, while Victor Fanneau de La Horie moved to rue des Saussaies and bought the Château de Saint-Just. Trébuchet traveled to Livorno to rejoin her husband and children, but learned that Léopold had a mistress named Catherine Thomas. Trébuchet returned to Paris with her three sons.

Sophie moved to rue de Clichy and decided to hide La Horie, who was suspected of going against the government. These cases were clarified, but La Horie was forced to sell his properties (including Saint-Just) and to go into exile in America, which he refused. In 1806, Trébuchet and the children visited Leopold in Naples, where he was living with his mistress. He opposed the idea of his family joining him due to his fears that his wife would discover his affair.

Trébuchet and her children came to see Hugo anyway, but they left the next day for Paris. They arrived on February 7, 1809 and settled in an old convent, rue des Feuillantines.

The chapel there was used as a hiding place for Victor Fanneau de La Horie. The children, at first, did not know of his presence, but soon discovered it. As a precaution, Trébuchet had him renamed M. de La Courland, and he became a new father for the three sons. On December 29, 1810 Victor Fanneau de La Horie was betrayed and arrested at the Feuillantines, under the eyes of the Trébuchet-Hugo family.

In March 1811, the family went to Spain to visit Léopold, who had become Count of Sigüenza. He was not aware they were coming, and therefore, after a dangerous journey through a hostile country at war, the family was welcomed in Madrid by Léopold's brother. Irritated by the actions of his wife, Léopold, living in Guadalajara with his mistress, sought divorce and the custody of his children, whom he placed at the College of Nobles in Madrid. Trébuchet refused her husband's instructions and asked for help from Joseph Bonaparte, who was king of Spain; the spouses were quickly reconciled. But after some time, Léopold learnt from an unknown source the connection between Victor Fanneau de La Horie and Trébuchet. She hoped to return to Paris as soon as possible for news of her lover.

One day she received an amount of 4,750 francs from Paris (she suspected La Horie of having sent it) and decided to leave at once; she took advantage of the escort of Marshal Bellune to cross Spain without trouble. In Paris, she regularly visited her lover, incarcerated in Vincennes.

She paid attention to the plot of General Malet, who announced the death of Napoleon Bonaparte in Russia. Victor Fanneau de La Horie, once released, was to become Minister of Police. But the plot was unveiled and the conspirators, of whom he was part, were imprisoned in the prison of the Abbey; they were all shot in the plain of Grenelle on October 29, 1812. Sophie followed the funeral convoy to the Vaugirard cemetery.

On December 31, 1813, the family moved to rue des Vieilles Thuileries (now rue du Cherche-Midi). Léopold arrived at Thionville where he presented Catherine Thomas as "General Hugo". Trébuchet decided to locate her husband, after he stopped paying their rent. She entrusted Eugene and Victor to the Foucher family and left with Abel. Léopold again asked for divorce, on grounds of adultery, and placed his sons in boarding school.

When Sophie returned to Paris, she discovered her apartment under seal and therefore asked the Fouchers for hospitality. Later, Léopold arrived in Paris with Catherine Thomas, whom he presented in the Salons; he returned to Thionville during the Hundred Days. Sophie regularly visited her sons at their college.

== Death ==
After finding her apartment, Trébuchet, impoverished, was forced to move to rue des Petits-Augustins, now rue Bonaparte. She recovered the custody of her children in 1818, when the civil court of the Seine pronounced the separation of the bodies and property of the Hugo couple. Abel was 20 years old, Eugène 18, and Victor 16. The eldest became a half-pay lieutenant and the younger two joined the Faculty of Law, while their father thought they were going to the Polytechnique. Discovering that Victor had extraordinary talents in poetry, Trébuchet sought to develop her own artistic talents. Victor dedicated his first poems to his mother.

The family was very close to Foucher, meeting regularly for a number of years since Mrs. Foucher had first received Trébuchet's sons for evenings at the Foucher home in Toulouse. One day, Trébuchet discovered that Victor and Adèle Foucher were in love. Not thinking much of the girl, she opposed their relationship.

In the spring of 1820, Sophie Trébuchet tended the garden, but suffered from the cold. She fell ill and died in bed in the afternoon of June 27, 1821.
