= La Charte de 1830 =

La Charte de 1830, subtitled journal du soir, was a French newspaper founded in Paris in 1836 by François Guizot. The publication supported the conservative party.

Established after the July Revolution of 1830, this daily was published from 27 September 1836 to 11 July 1838. Nestor Roqueplan was the director as well as the main redactor with Armand Malitourne (chief editor).

In 1838 it was absorbed into Le Moniteur parisien.

== Main collaborators ==
- Gérard de Nerval, published seven dramatic feuilletons in La Charte.
- Théophile Gautier
- Louis Veuillot
- Charles Rabou
- François Guessard

== Bibliography ==
- Paul Ginisty, Anthologie du journalisme du XVIIe siècle à nos jours, vol.I, La Révolution, le premier Empire, la Restauration, la seconde Restauration, le Gouvernement de juillet, la Révolution de 1848, 1917
