= Édouard d'Anglemont =

French playwright, librettist and romantic poet

- Born: Édouard Hubert Scipion d’Anglemont; 28 December 1798; Pont-Audemer
- Died: 22 April 1876 (aged 77); Paris
- Occupations: Playwright; Poet; Librettist

Édouard Hubert Scipion d’Anglemont (French pronunciation: [edwaʁ ybɛʁ sipjɔ̃ dɑ̃ɡləmɔ̃]; 28 December 1798 – 22 April 1876) was a 19th-century French playwright, librettist and romantic poet.

== Works ==
- 1823: La Pacification de l’Espagne, ode
- 1823: Nouveau Chant français
- 1824: Louis XVIII, ode
- 1825: Odes légitimistes
- 1827: Berthe et Robert, poème en quatre chants
- 1832: Le Duc d’Enghien
- 1835: Pèlerinage
- 1838: Westminster et le château de Windsor
- 1840: Les Euménides
- 1840: Sainte-Hélène et les Invalides
- 1841: Amours de France
- 1860: Roses de Noël
- 1869: Les Pastels dramatiques
- 1872: Résurrection de la Colonne
- 1875: Voix d'Arain
- 1875: La Horde bonapartiste

Theatre

- 1826: Le Cachemire, comedy in one act and in verse, with Jean-Pierre Lesguillon and Jean-Joseph Ader, Paris, Théâtre de l'Odéon, 16 December
- 1827: Tancredi, three-act opera, with Jean-Pierre Lesguillon, music by Rossini arranged by Lemière de Corvey, Théâtre de l'Odéon, 7 September
- 1831: Paul Ier, three-act historical drama in prose, with Théodore Muret, Théâtre de l'Ambigu-Comique, 27 December

Texts online

- Louis XVIII
- Berthe et Robert, poème en quatre chants
- Résurrection de la Colonne
- Sainte-Hélène et les Invalides
- Westminster et le château de Windsor
- Nouveau Chant français
- La Pacification de l’Espagne
- La Horde bonapartiste
- Tancrède, three-act opera

== Bibliography ==
- Germain Sarrut and Edme-Théodore Bourg, Biographie d’Édouard Hubert Scipion d’Anglemont, Paris, E.-T. Krabbe, 1841

== Sources ==
- Eugène Asse, Les Petits Romantiques, Paris, H. Leclerc, 1900, (p. 205-341)
- Gustave Vapereau, Dictionnaire universel des contemporains, Paris, Hachette, 1858, (p. 49)
