= Joseph Léopold Sigisbert Hugo =

French general and father of Victor Hugo (1773–1828)

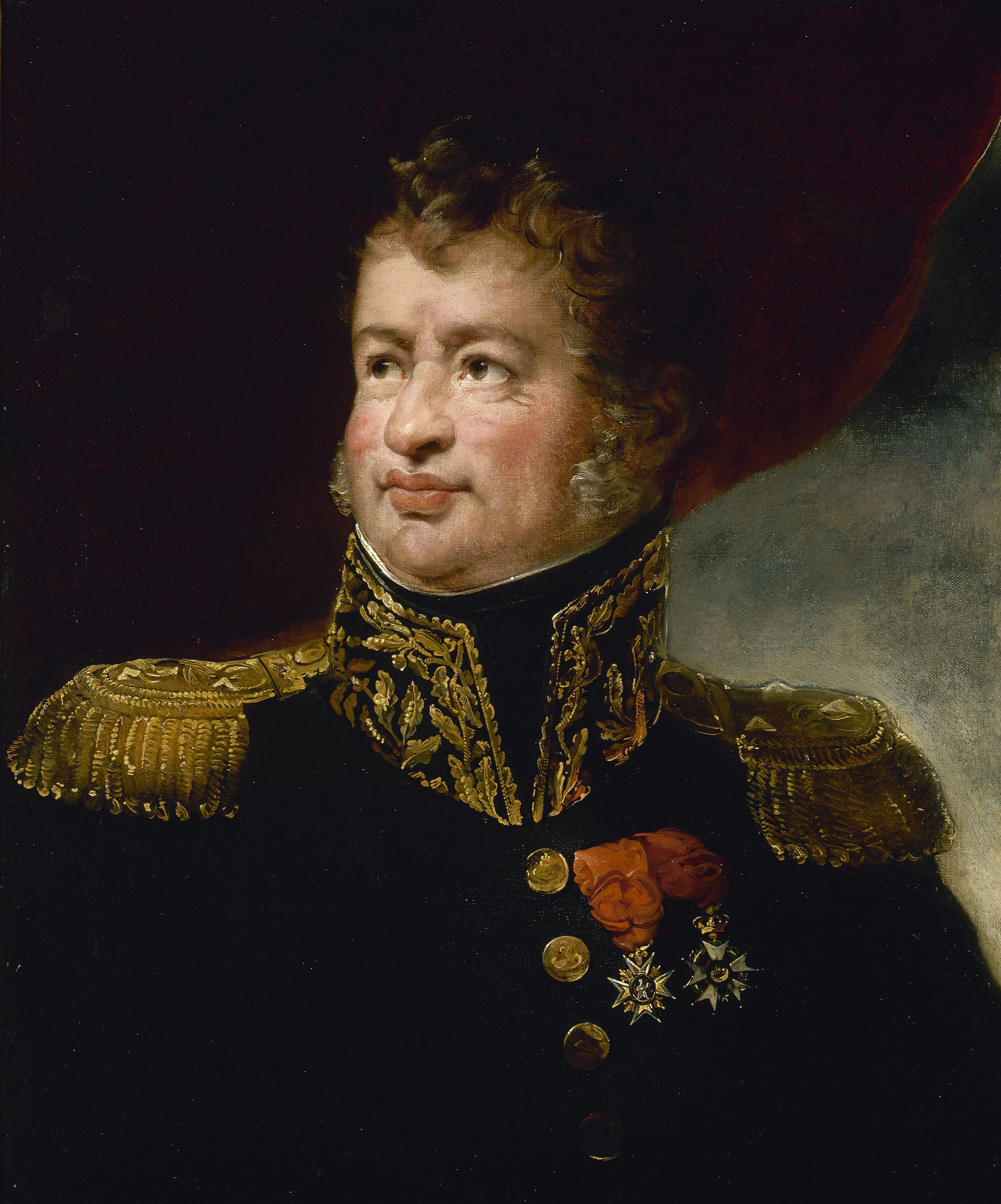
- Portrait attributed to Julie Hugo
- Born: 15 November 1773; Nancy, France
- Died: 29 January 1828 (aged 54) Paris, France
- Rank: Maréchal de camp
- Spouse: Sophie Trébuchet
- Children: 3 sons, including Abel and Victor

Joseph Léopold Sigisbert Hugo, Count Hugo de Cogolludo y Sigüenza (French pronunciation: [ʒozɛf leɔpɔl(d) siʒisbɛʁ yɡo]; 15 November 1773 – 29 January 1828) was a French general in the Napoleonic Wars. He was the husband of Sophie Trébuchet and the father of three sons. He is best known for his relationship to his third son, the writer and French peer Victor Hugo.

== Early life ==
Joseph Léopold Hugo was the youngest son of Joseph Hugo, a former adjutant in the army of the Kingdom of France, and Jeanne-Marguerite Hugo. His four elder brothers all served as soldiers, a profession he himself took up in 1787 when he enlisted at the age of fourteen. He met Sophie Trébuchet in 1796 in a town of France called Châteaubriant, marrying her the following year in Paris. They had three sons, Abel, Eugène, and Victor.

== Military career ==
Joseph Léopold Hugo was appointed an officer in 1790, and in 1791 he was appointed to a command in the Army of the Rhine. He fought in engagements along the length of the Rhine and as far as the Danube. Later, he was assigned as a battalion commander to fight against insurgents in Vendée and Brittany.

From 1800 to 1802, he was stationed in Besançon, after which point he transferred first to Marseille and afterwards to Bastia. There, he went into the service of Joseph Bonaparte, then King of Naples, and fought against insurgents in the kingdom. The King appointed him a Colonel in February 1808, for capturing and executing the famed guerilla leader Fra Diavolo. Hugo followed the King to serve in Spain throughout the Peninsular War, where he was appointed General.

After the retreat from Spain and the Battle of Vitoria on 21 June 1813, General Hugo was demoted to the rank of Major by order of Napoleon. Later, after being restored to the rank of General, he remained with the army until Napoleon's abdication, later returning to his service during the Hundred Days.

== Death ==
After being relieved of duty by ordinance in 1824, Joseph Léopold Hugo retired to his residence in Blois at the age of 51. On 29 January 1828 Hugo suffered a stroke and died at age 54; his body was interred in the Père Lachaise Cemetery in Paris.

== Publications ==
Hugo, writing under the pseudonym Genti, published several works throughout his life, including:

- Mémoires sur les moyens de suppléer à la traite des nègres par des individus libres, etc. (= Memoirs on the means of supplying the slave trade with free individuals, etc.), Blois: 1818;
- Journal historique du blocus de Thionville en 1815, et des sièges de cette ville, Sierck et Rodemack en 1815 (= Historical journal of the blockade of Thionville in 1815, and of the sieges of this city, Sierck and Rodemack in 1815), Blois: 1819;
- Mémoires du général Hugo (= Memoirs of General Hugo), Paris: 1820; republished as: Mémoires du général Hugo, gouverneur de plusieurs provinces et aide-major-général des armées en Espagne, Paris: Ladvocat, 1823 (series: Collection des Mémoires des maréchaux de France et des généraux français), 3 volumes.

He also published a work on the defense of convoys, which was reprinted several times.
