= Le Messager des Chambres =

French newspaper

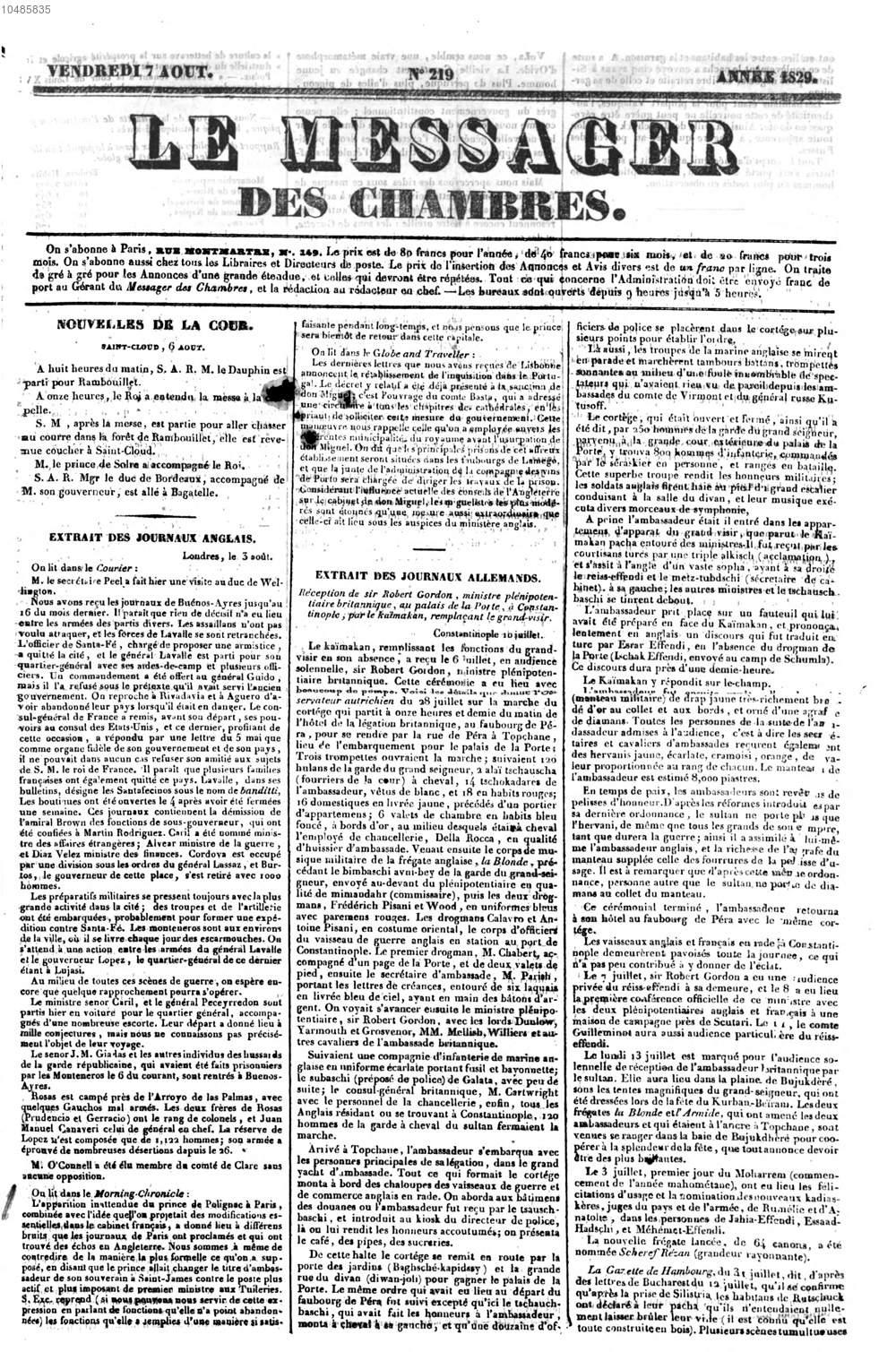

Le Messager des Chambres was a French newspaper whose founder was the vicount de Martignac, ultra-royalist who fought against the laws of censorship in France under the July Monarchy.

Among the editors were Charles Rabou (1803–1871), the stenographs Hippolyte Prévost, Augustin Grosselin, Armand Malitourne, Hippolyte Lamarche...

In 1827, the historian Jean-Baptiste Honoré Raymond Capefigue became chief editor of the paper before the publication was taken over by Alexandre Colonna-Walewski, Count Walewski.

The paper was printed at least from 1828 to 1852.

== Sources ==
- Retronews.
