= Hermance Lesguillon =

French poet and novelist

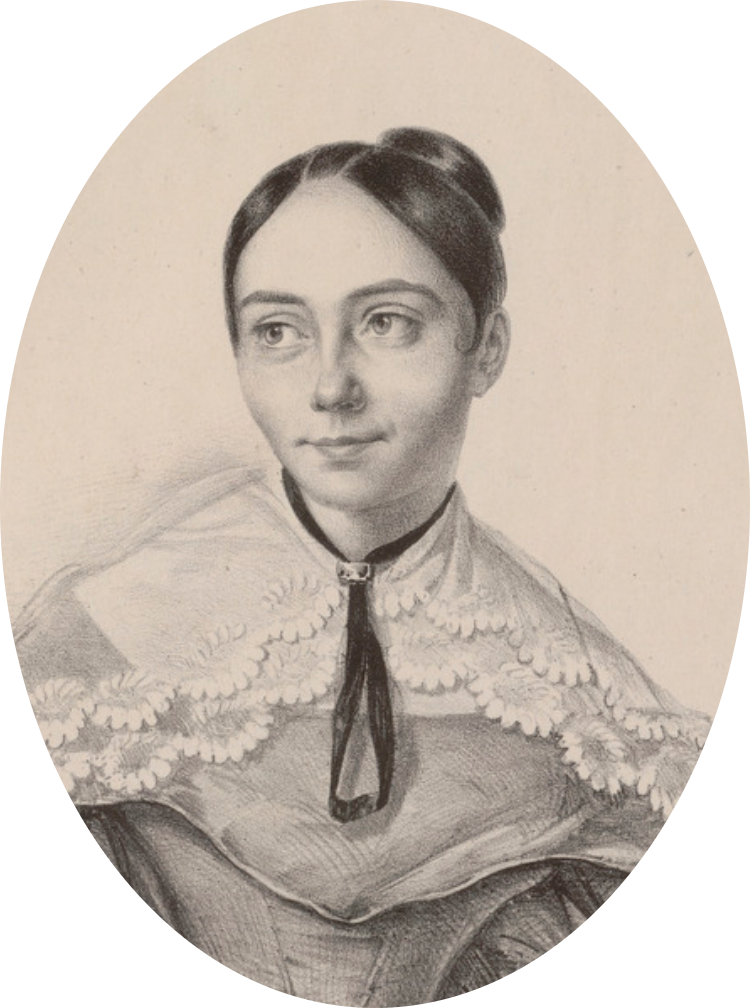
- Born: Hermance Sandrin; 1800; Paris
- Died: 29 September 1882 (aged 81–82); Paris
- Occupations: Novelist, poet
- Spouse: Jean-Pierre Lesguillon

Hermance Lesguillon, née Sandrin (1800 – 29 September 1882) was a 19th-century French poet and novelist. She used the synonyms Madame Hermance and Hermance Sandrin.

She was the wife of Jean-Pierre Lesguillon (1800–1873), and like him, she produced verse and many novels.

She survived her husband by several years and when she died, she bequeathed most of her fortune to the Société des gens de lettres (Society of People of Letters of France).

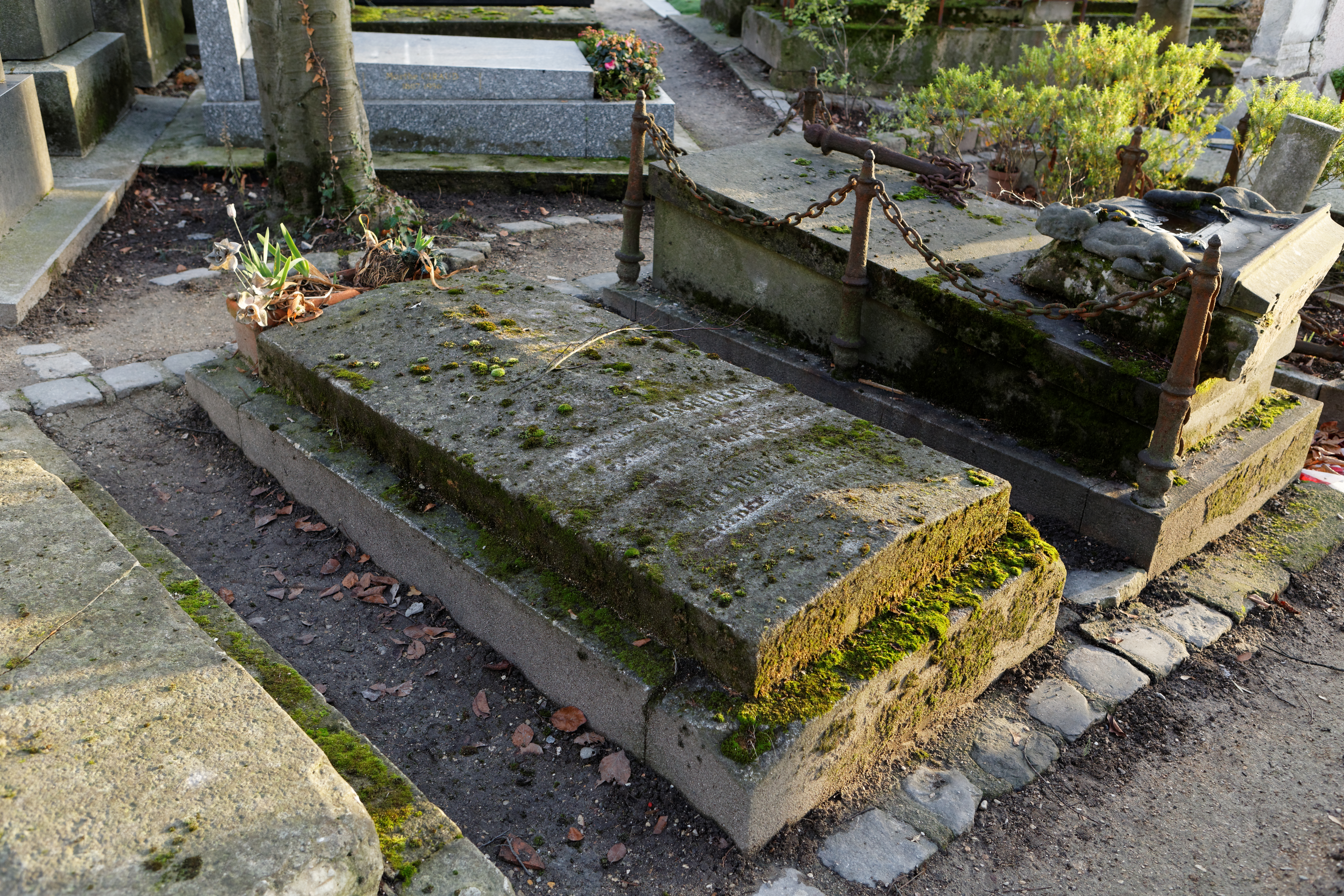
Lesguillon's grave at Père Lachaise cemetery

She is buried with her husband at Père Lachaise Cemetery (49th division).

== Works ==
- 1875: Les Adieux
- 1851: Les Anges de Noël
- 1863: Aux Grecs d’aujourd’hui
- 1865: Le Ballon géant, couronné par l’Académie de Dunkerque
- L’Arbre de la liberté (included in Biographie du citoyen Garnier-Pagès, par E. M…)
- 1855: Contes du cœur
- La Laide (included in Le Conteur)
- 1877: Les Crèches des petits enfants
- 1863: Les Deux Destinées.
- 1846: Les Deux Maintenon
- 1849: Les Deux Napoléon
- La Vierge de Van Dyck (included in L’écho des feuilletons)
- La Première Communion (included in Émotions)
- 1866: L’Esprit qui cherche un corps
- 1880: La Femme d’aujourd’hui, poésies, saynètes in verse and in prose, theatre
- 1859: Les Femmes dans cent ans
- 1848: La France à Lamartine
- 1872: L’Homme, réponse à M. Alexandre Dumas fils
- 1846: Les Mauvais jours
- 1842: Le Midi de l’âme
- 1851: Le Neveu de l’abbé de Saint-Pierre
- 1845: Le Prêtre au XIXe
- 1871: Le Prisonnier d’Allemagne, scène à trois personnages
- 1840: Rayons d’amour
- 1833: Rêveuse
- Bleu et Blanche (included in Revue des feuilletons)
- 1843: Rosane
- 1836: Rosées
- Les Sept vertus, ou Science du bonheur
- 1867: Un tableau du martyre de saint Laurent, by Emmanuel Théaulon, l’auteur dramatique.
- 1836: Théâtre moral à l’usage des jeunes personnes
- 1861: La Tirelire de l’écolier
- 1875: Les Vraies perles
