= La Lanterne magique (magazine) =

La Lanterne magique (French pronunciation: [la lɑ̃tɛʁn maʒik]) was a former French 19th-century weekly, published on Saturdays. The subtitle read: Reproductions of masterpieces of painting and literature.

It was first released 2 May 1857 and appeared up to issue #65 in August 1858. The editor was Adolphe Delahays, the engravings by Louis Paul Pierre Dumont.

== Published works ==
- Léon Beauvallet, À travers les deux mondes
- Jacques Amyot, Daphnis et Chloé
- C. Noël, Un amour de Goethe
- Elizabeth Inchbald, Simple histoire
- Henry de Kock, Le Roi des étudiants
- Spindler, Contes pour tous
- Alphonse de Lamartine, Graziella
- Auguste Maquet, La Maison du baigneur
- Kaufmann, Le Lantana des Batignolles

== Sources ==
- Claude Witkowski. (1997). Les Éditions populaires 1848-1870, GIPPE, (p. 143)
