= Poems of Victor Hugo =

Hugo's Poems

The poems of Victor Hugo captured the spirit of the Romantic era. They were largely devoted to 19th-century causes. Many touched on religious themes. Initially they were royalist but soon became Bonapartist, Republican and liberal. Hugo's poems on nature revealed a continuing search for the great sublime.

Like many young writers of his generation, Hugo was profoundly influenced by François-René de Chateaubriand, the founder of Romanticism and France's pre-eminent literary figure during the early 1800s. In his youth, Hugo resolved to be "Chateaubriand or nothing", and his life would come to parallel that of his predecessor's in many ways. Like Chateaubriand, Hugo would further the cause of Romanticism, become involved in politics as a champion of Republicanism, and be forced into exile due to his political stances. Between 1829 and 1840 he would publish five more volumes of poetry (Les Orientales, 1829; Les Feuilles d'automne, 1831; Les Chants du crépuscule, 1835; Les Voix intérieures, 1837; and Les Rayons et les ombres, 1840), cementing his reputation as one of the greatest elegiac and lyric poets of his time.

The passion and eloquence of Hugo's early work brought success and fame at an early age. His first collection of poetry (Nouvelles Odes et Poésies Diverses) was published in 1824, when Hugo was only twenty two years old, and earned him a royal pension from Louis XVIII. Though the poems were admired for their spontaneous fervor and fluency, it was the collection that followed two years later in 1826 (Odes et Ballades) which revealed Hugo to be a great poet, a natural master of lyric and creative song.

== Collections ==
=== Poems published during Hugo's lifetime ===
- Odes et poésies diverses (1822)
- Nouvelles Odes (1824)
- Odes et Ballades (1828, a collection of poems written between 1822 and 1828)
- Les Orientales (1829)
- Les Feuilles d'automne (1831)
- Les Chants du crépuscule (1835)
- Les Voix intérieures (1837)
- Les Rayons et les Ombres (1840)
- Les Châtiments (1853, a collection of poems attacking Napoleon III)
- Les Contemplations (1856, dealt with the death of his daughter and the pain of exile)
- La Légende des siècles (Part One 1859, recounting man's struggle throughout history)
- Les Chansons des rues et des bois (1865)
- L'Année terrible (1872, about the Franco-Prussian War, the death of his son Charles, and the Paris Commune)
- L'Art d'être grand-père (1877, about being the guardian of his orphaned grandchildren)
- La Légende des siècles (Part Two 1877)
- Le Pape (1878, a condemnation of Pope Pius IX)
- La Pitié suprême (1879)
- Religions et religion (1880)
- L'Âne (1880)
- Les Quatre Vents de l'esprit (1881)
- Final part of La Légende des Siècles (1883)

=== Posthumous collections ===
- La Fin de Satan (1886)
- Dieu (1891)
- 1941 (1891)

=== Posthumous collections selected from Hugo's manuscripts ===
- Toute la Lyre (1888, 1893, 1897, 1935–1937)
- Les Années funestes (1898)
- Dernière Gerbe (1902, 1941, the title is not Hugo's own)
- Océan, Tas de pierres (1942)
- Le Verso de la page (1960)
- Œuvres d'enfance et de jeunesse, 1814-20 (juvenilia, 1964)
