= La Pitié suprême =

La Pitié suprême ("The Supreme Compassion") is a long poem in fifteen sections, by Victor Hugo, published in February 1879.

It was originally part of La Légende des Siècles, and was linked with the immense poem La Révolution which was supposed to be at its centre. The two long poems which would follow La Révolution -- Le Verso de la page and La Pitié Suprême—would serve to explain or justify God's permission of the violence of the French Revolution by pointing to its ultimate effect of liberation.

La Légende des Siècles developed differently, however, and the central episode was set aside. Le Verso de la page was separated into several pieces, and La Pitié Suprême published alone (but in the same stretch of work as Le Pape, L'Âne and Religions et religion, forming a kind of philosophical testament), two years before its original parent La Révolution appeared as part of Les Quatre Vents de l'esprit in 1881.
