= Cain (Cormon) =

Painting by Fernand Cormon

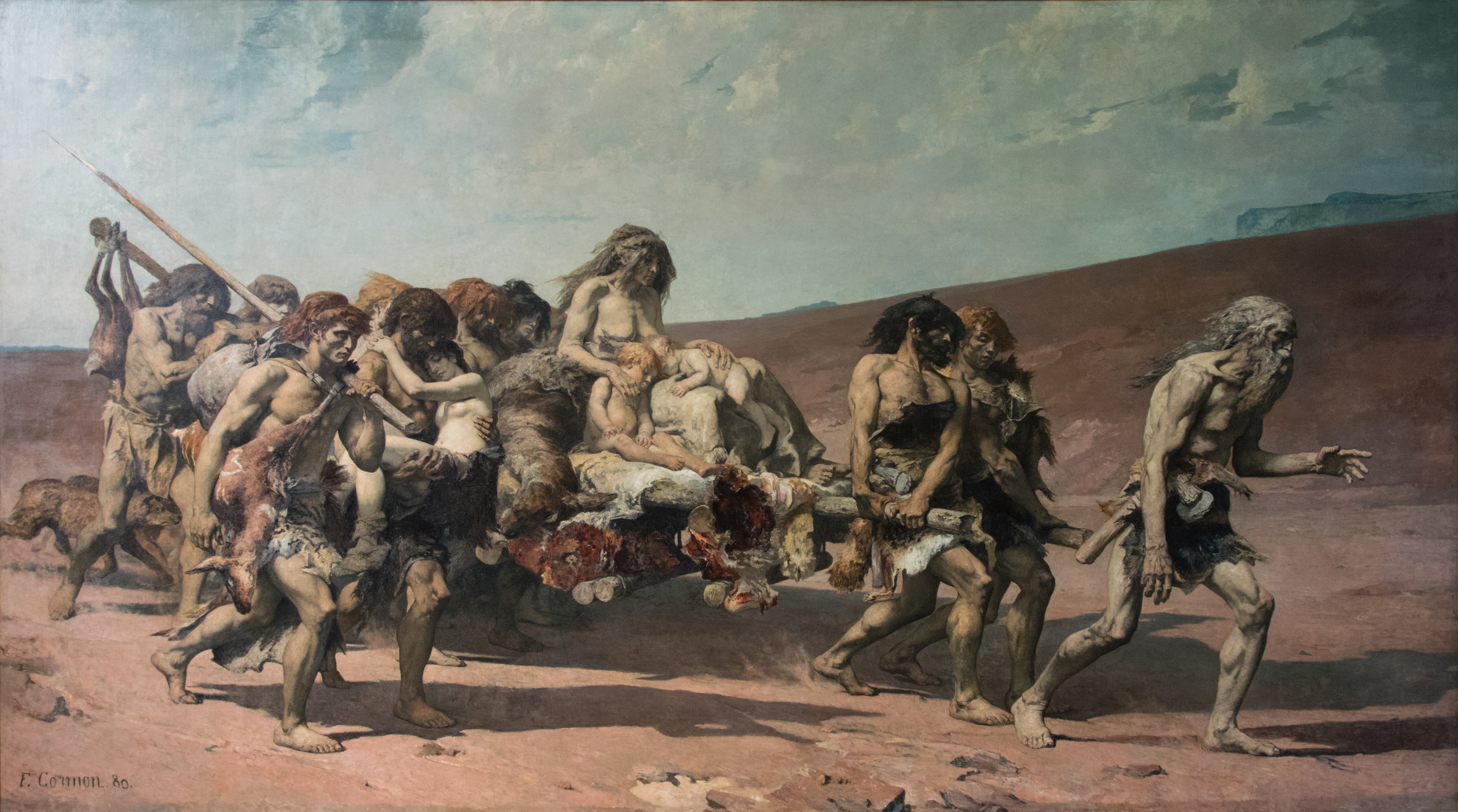
Cain (1880), by Fernand Cormon

Cain (subtitled “Conscience”) is an oil on canvas painting by Fernand Cormon. It hangs in the Musée d'Orsay, in Paris. It is very large - seven metres wide - and the human figures it includes are close to life size.

== Provenance ==
The painting was bought from the artist at the salon of 1880 by the French state and from 1881 to 1926 it was exhibited at the Musée du Luxembourg. It then went into storage until 1980, and there were rumours that it had been destroyed. It was not rediscovered in storage until 1980 when it was assigned to the Louvre collection and allocated to the Musée d’Orsay. After conservation work it was displayed for the first time in 1985.

== Composition ==
It depicts the fate of Cain, the elder son of Adam and Eve. After murdering his younger brother Abel, Cain was cursed to perpetual wandering, finding no rest anywhere. The scene in the painting is clearly one from many years later - Cain is now old and weatherbeaten, lean but well-muscled as he leads his family forward. He walks with urgency and purpose, yet also as if he was dreaming, and as if feeling his way forward like a blind person.

At the centre of the painting is not Cain himself but his wife, sitting on a wooden stretcher carried by his sons, looking old with a wild demeanour, holding onto two infants. Chunks of bleeding meat are hung beneath her. Other men are trudging alongside. One is carrying a young woman in his arms, another is carrying game they have hunted on a pole. Dogs bring up the rear.

The curse not only condemns Cain to wander forever, but also reverses his earlier achievements as a farmer. Hence the ground in the painting is arid and devoid of any vegetation; the earth itself denies him its fruit and instead forces him and his family to a hunting life. Cain will never be able to stay anywhere long enough to plant or harvest.

As well illustrating a Biblical story, the work is an anthropological reconstruction. It introduced prehistory as a new type of subject in large-scale academic history painting art at a time when Stone Age rock paintings were just being discovered. The painting sits clearly outside the norm for artistic representation of biblical figures and themes. No metaphysical or poetical meaning is attempted. Instead it illustrates “the ferocious primal instincts of our kind in the infancy of our race.” and the brutal effects of God's curse.

The main impression in the viewer is one of movement - the urgent, hurried pace at which all the figures are walking. Cormon also used earthy colours, pallid, fierce and washed out, to suggest an elemental struggle and, together with the vigour of the movement, exhaustion. Cormon lengthened the shadows as if the light of truth were pursuing the guilty. His use of light also suggests the haste to move away from the previous day's dwelling place before night falls.

== Artistic development ==
The painting was inspired by Victor Hugo’s poem La Légende des siècles, a passage from which Cormon added to his work as a subtitle when it was exhibited.

"Lorsque avec ses enfants vêtus de peaux de bêtes
Echevelé, livide au milieu des tempêtes
Caïn se fut enfui de devant Jéhovah
Comme le soir tombait, l'homme sombre arriva
Au bas d’une montagne en une grande plaine..."

"When with his children clothed in animal skins
Dishevelled, livid, buffeted by the storms
Cain fled from Jehovah,
In the fading light, the grim man came
To the foot of a mountain in a vast plain..."

In this work, the artist both paid homage to tradition and aimed at innovation. Although the story of Cain and Abel had been a common artistic theme for centuries, the focus on his wandering rather than his murder of Abel or its immediate aftermath was not. In 1836 Theodore Chasseriau had painted The Punishment of Cain and in 1852 fr: Pierre Félix Trezel had painted The Flight of Cain after his Crime, both with broadly the same subject, and it is possible that Cormon had seen Trezel's canvas at the Exposition Universelle of 1855.

Cormon began making his first study for the painting in 1877 and he produced further sketches in 1878. He worked on the final canvas itself for two years. Cormon insisted on anatomical accuracy in his figures and had live models pose in his studio for each figure, dressed in goatskins.

== Exhibition history ==
- 1880 - Salon de la Société des artistes français - Palais des Champs Elysées - Paris
- 1880 - XXXI Ghent International Exhibition
- 1889 + Exposition Universelle - Champ-de-Mars - Paris

== Critical reception ==
Cormon's Cain was the sensation of the 1880 Salon. Although it did not win the gold medal, it did earn its creator the Legion of Honour.

Alfred Temple described it as “a great achievement, and the work rightly ranks as one of high teaching and impressive force.” Stéphane Loysel praised it and said it showed that Cormon had at last freed himself from the influence of Eugène Delacroix.

Though popular, the painting was controversial because it so clearly alluded to contemporary conceptions of ancient society that derived ultimately from the theories of Charles Darwin. Art historians have recognised that Cormon was among the earliest artists to incorporate a scientific visual vocabulary into academic history painting.

Those who were critical of the work pointed to its breaches of conventional style and its washed out colour palette. Some were simply repulsed by it. Charles Clément commented that “all of this is too revolting and violates the most natural laws…. But if man descends from the ape, he should not have depicted him so close to his origins.” Henry Havard criticised Cormon for the “repulsive ugliness of these savages.”

== See also ==
- Cain and His Race Cursed By God
