= La Fin de Satan =

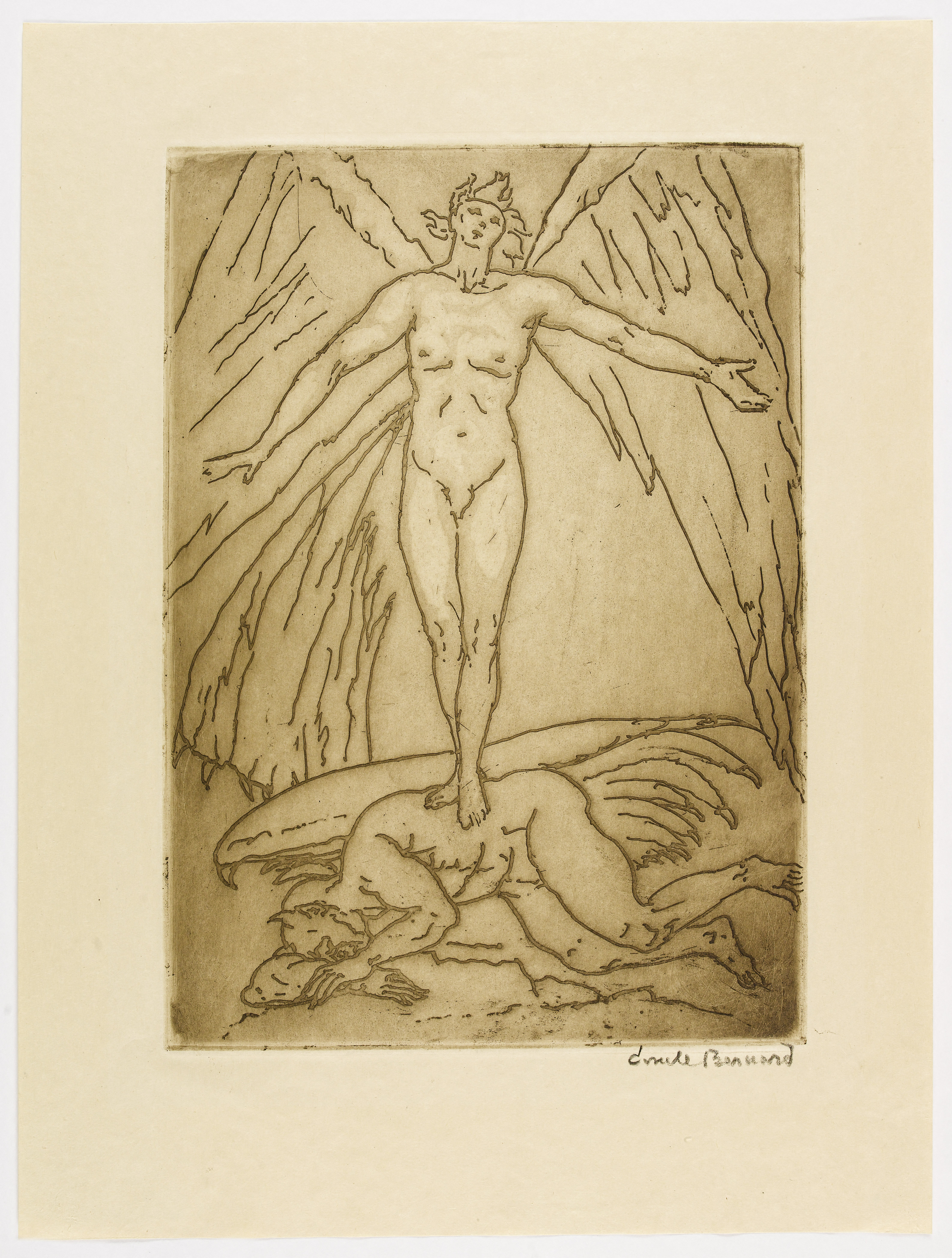
An engraving by Emile Bernard illustrating Victor Hugo's La Fin de Satan

La Fin de Satan ("The End of Satan", 1886) is a long religious epic by Victor Hugo, of which 5,700 lines were written between 1854 and 1862, but left unfinished and published after his death.

When it was rejected by his publisher in 1857, Hugo tried to integrate it into Petites Epopées (later La Légende des siècles), eventually announcing that it would form a companion work, along with Dieu. His intention, apparently, was to invest the storming of the Bastille with a religious significance; after making various efforts, he ceased work on it in 1862 and returned to novels. There are many gaps large and small.

== Argument ==
Satan is defeated and thrown into the Abyss ("Depuis quatre mille ans il tombait dans l'abîme"), but Evil is communicated to Man through the agency of Lilith-Isis. She provides three weapons with which Cain murders Abel:

Il le frappa d'abord avec un clou d'airain,
Puis avec un bâton, puis avec une pierre;
Puis il cacha ses trois complices sous la terre
Où ma main qui s'ouvrait dans l'ombre les a pris.

Translation:

He struck him first with a brazen nail,
Then with a stave, then with a stone;
Then he hid his complices three 'neath the earth
Where my hand, opened in the dark, picked them up.

The Bronze will become a gauntlet, symbol of War; the Wood will become a gibbet, or crucifix, symbol of Execution; and the Stone will become a prison, symbol of Oppression.

This preface is followed by three books, interleaved with otherworldly episodes.

Book the First tells the story of Nimrod, a powerful and monstrous king of Judaea. Wandering the Earth, which he has fully dominated and laid waste, he decides to conquer the heavens. For this purpose, he builds a cage and attaches four giant eagles to it, with the meat of dead lions above their heads to draw them upward. With his servant, the eunuch, Nimrod releases the cage from its tethers, and the eagles start towards the heavens. After a journey of one year, moving continuously upwards and finding only an immense blue, Nimrod shoots an arrow into the infinite, and is thrown back to Earth.

Book the Second describes the life and death of Jesus. It emphasises the evil of human beings. In "Tenebres" (II:XXI), Barabbas curses this impure world which liberated him instead of Christ, and claims that we would have chosen to die if offered the choice.

Book the Third is about the storming of the Bastille. (Almost nothing in this book was completed.)

== Structure ==
- Hors de la Terre ("Beyond Earth"), I
- La Première Page
- Livre Première: Le Glaive
- Hors de la Terre, II
- Livre Deuxième: Le Gibet ("The Gallows")
  - La Judée ("Judea")
  - Jésus-Christ
  - Le Crucifix
- Hors de la Terre, III
  - Satan dans la Nuit ("Satan at Night")
  - L'Ange Liberté ("The Angel of Liberty")
- Livre Troisième: La Prison
- Hors de la Terre, IV
