= Antoine Étex =

French painter

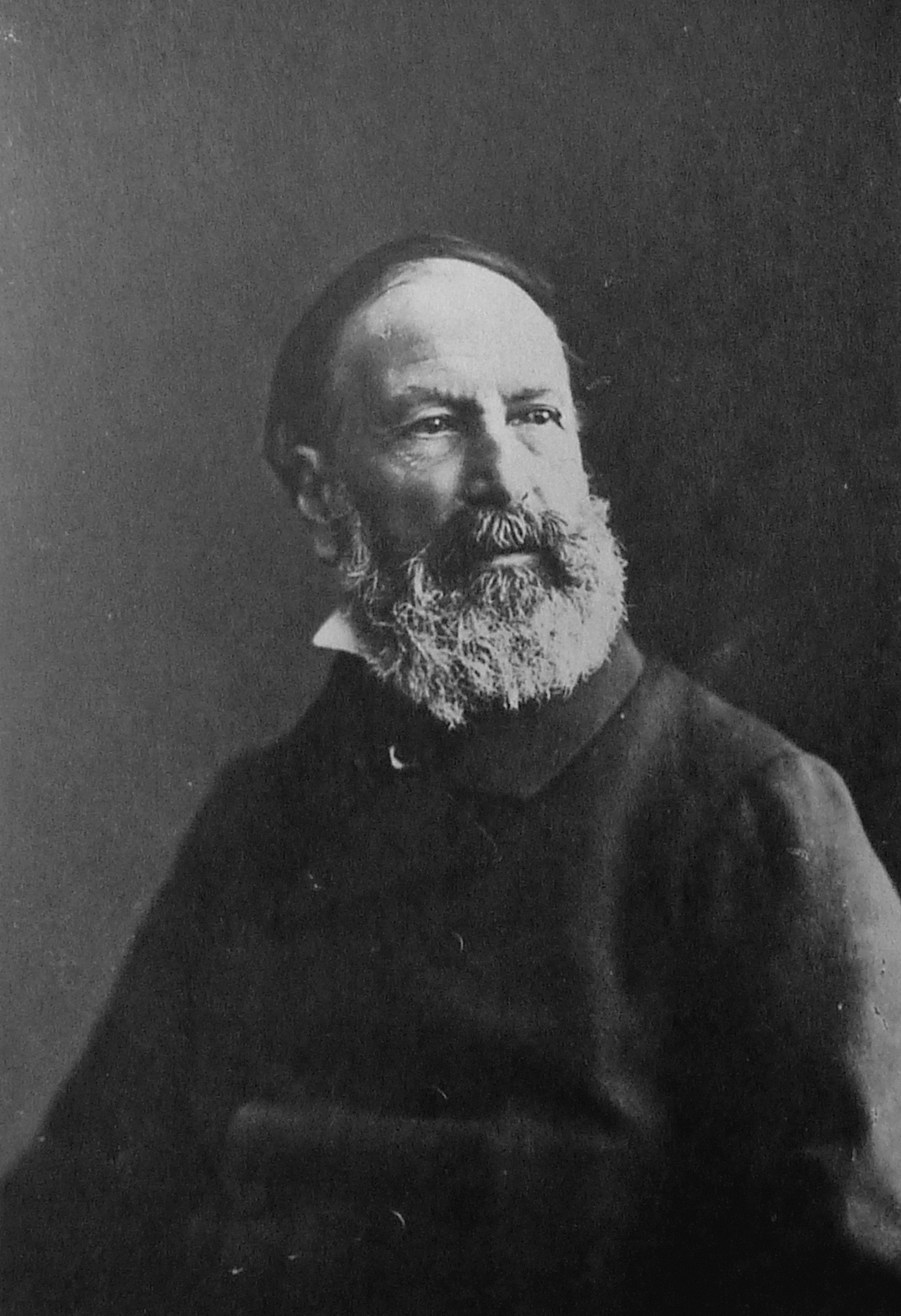
- Étex in 1876, by Nadar
- Born: March 20, 1808; Paris, France
- Died: July 14, 1888 (aged 80); Chaville, Seine-et-Oise
- Occupations: Sculptor, painter and architect

Antoine Étex (French: [ɑ̃twan etɛks]; March 20, 1808 Paris – July 14, 1888 Chaville) was a French sculptor, painter and architect.

== Biography ==
He first exhibited in the Paris Salon of 1833, his work including a reproduction in marble of his Death of Hyacinthus, and the plaster cast of his Cain and His Race Cursed By God. Adolphe Thiers, who was at this time minister of public works, now commissioned him to execute the two groups of Peace and War, flanking the arch on the east facade of the Arc de Triomphe. This last, which established his reputation, he reproduced in marble in the Paris Salon of 1839.

The French capital contains numerous examples of the sculptural works of Étex, which included mythological and religious subjects besides a great number of portraits. Among the best known of his architectural productions is Étex's tomb of Théodore Géricault in Père Lachaise Cemetery, which includes a bronze figure of the painter, and a low-relief version the painter's controversial Raft of the Medusa on a front panel.

Étex's paintings include the subjects of Eurydice and the martyrdom of Saint Sebastian, and he also wrote a number of essays on subjects connected with the arts. The last year of his life was spent at Nice, and he died at Chaville, Seine-et-Oise in 1888. He was buried in the Cimetière du Montparnasse in Paris.

== Works ==
- Sainte-Geneviève, marble, 1830, Clamecy, collégiale Saint-Martin
- Caïn et sa race maudits de Dieu, marble, (1832–1839), Lyon, musée des Beaux-Arts
- La Résistance de 1814, stone, (1833–1837), Paris, arc de triomphe de l'Étoile, western façade
- La Paix, stone, (1833–1837), Paris, arc de triomphe de l'Étoile, western façade
- Tombeau de Géricault, Paris, Père Lachaise Cemetery, its plaster model was at the 1841 Salon, Rouen, Musée des Beaux-Arts
- Portrait de Léon Pelet, bust, marble, 1848, Paris, musée du Louvre
- Portrait du baron Dufour, maire de Metz (1769–1842), medal, marble, 1845, Metz, Grand salon de l'Hôtel de Ville
- Médaillon du poète Auguste Brizeux (1803–1858) at the cemetery of Carnel in Lorient; medal, marble, 1858

== Gallery ==
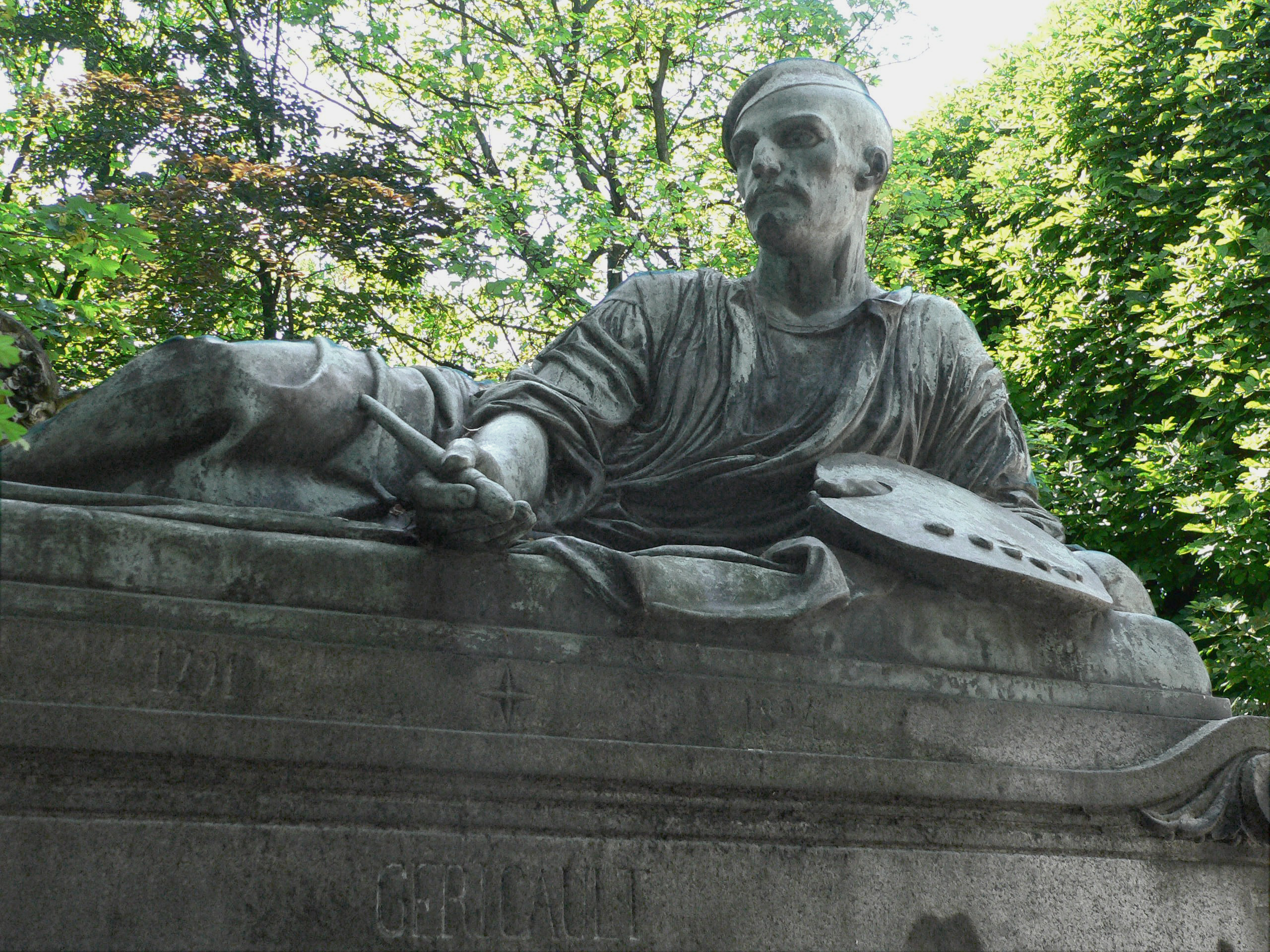
Étex's tomb of Théodore Géricault

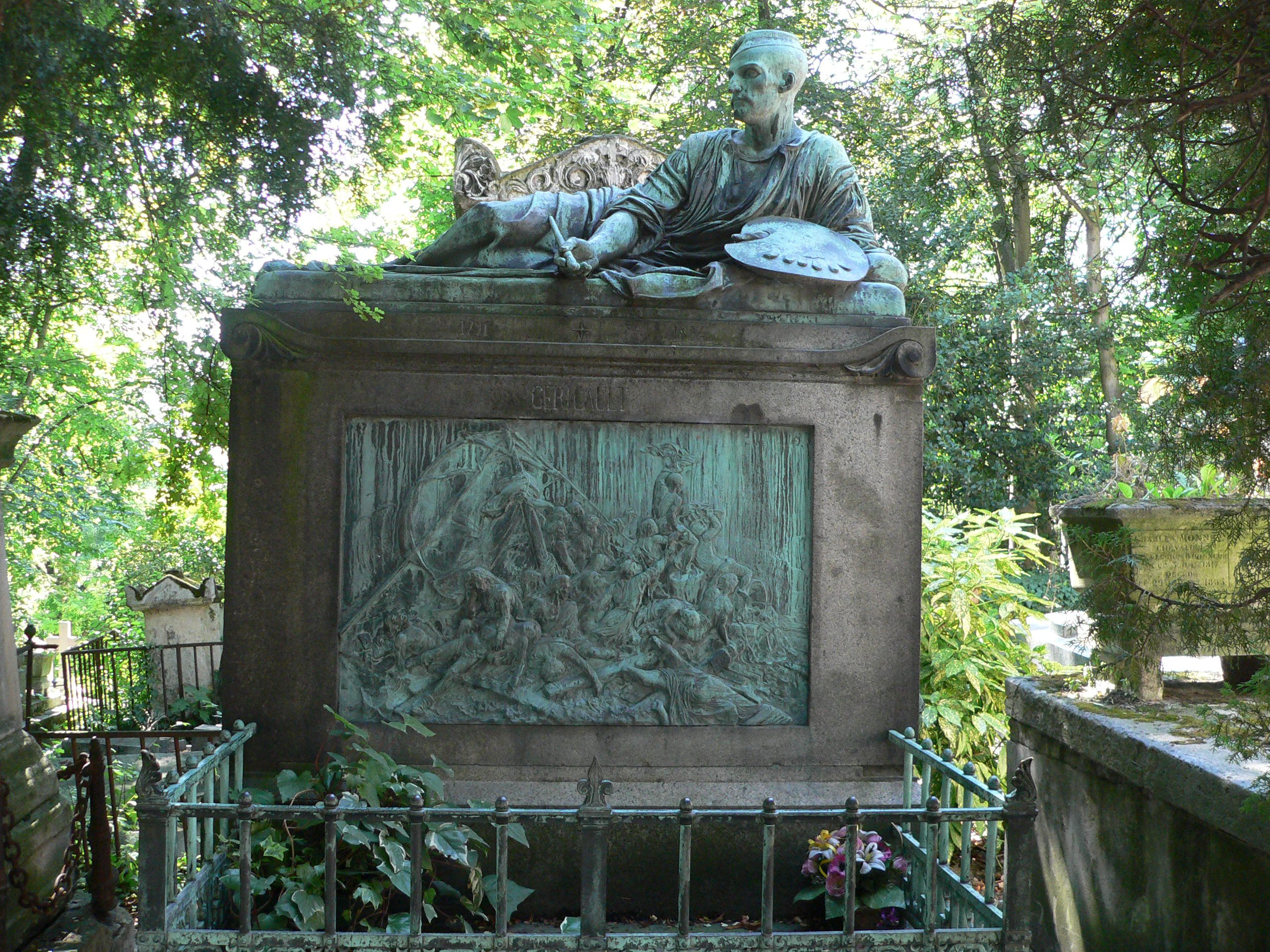
Géricault's tomb, showing front panel

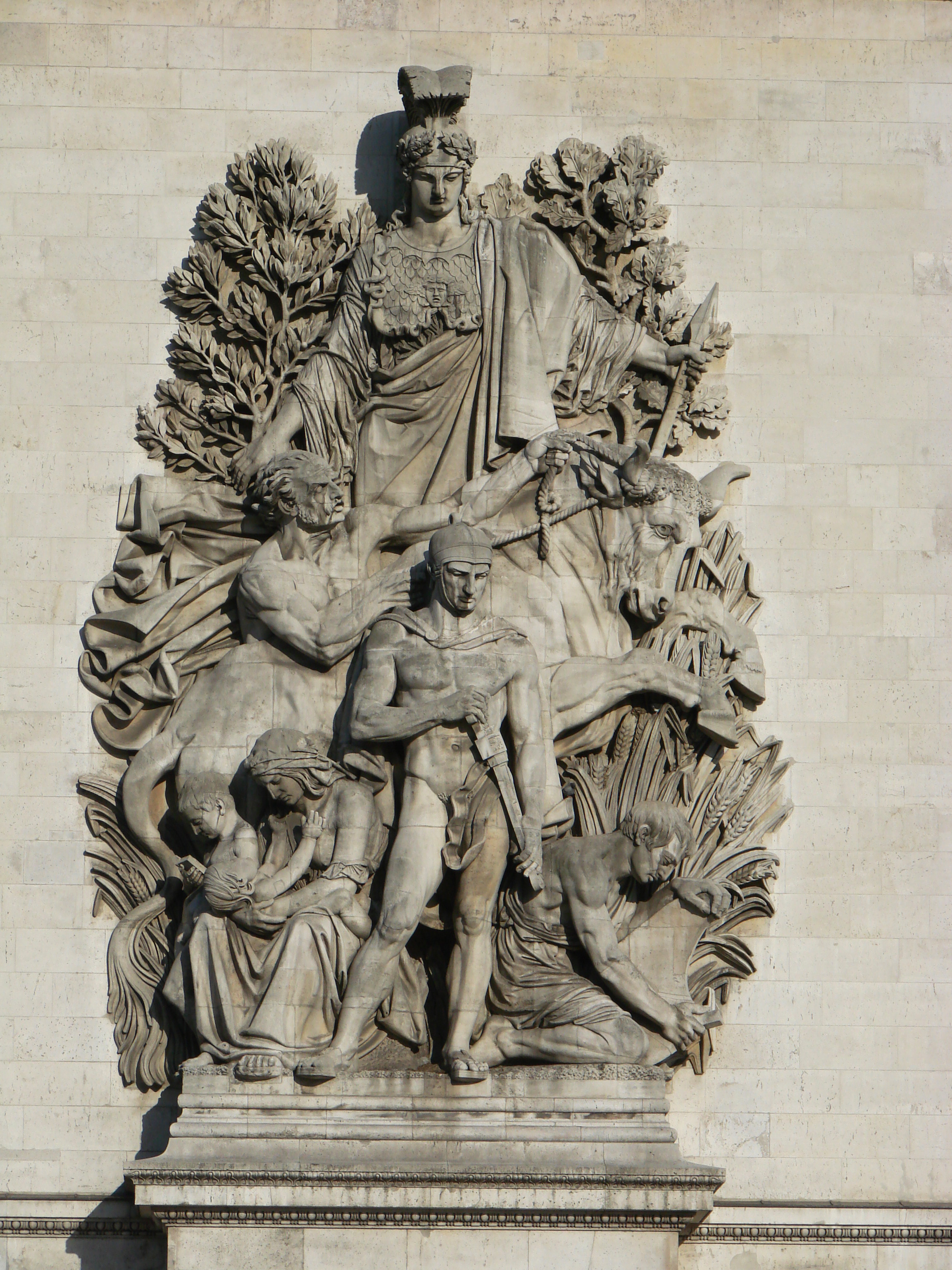
Peace, east facade of the Arc de Triomphe

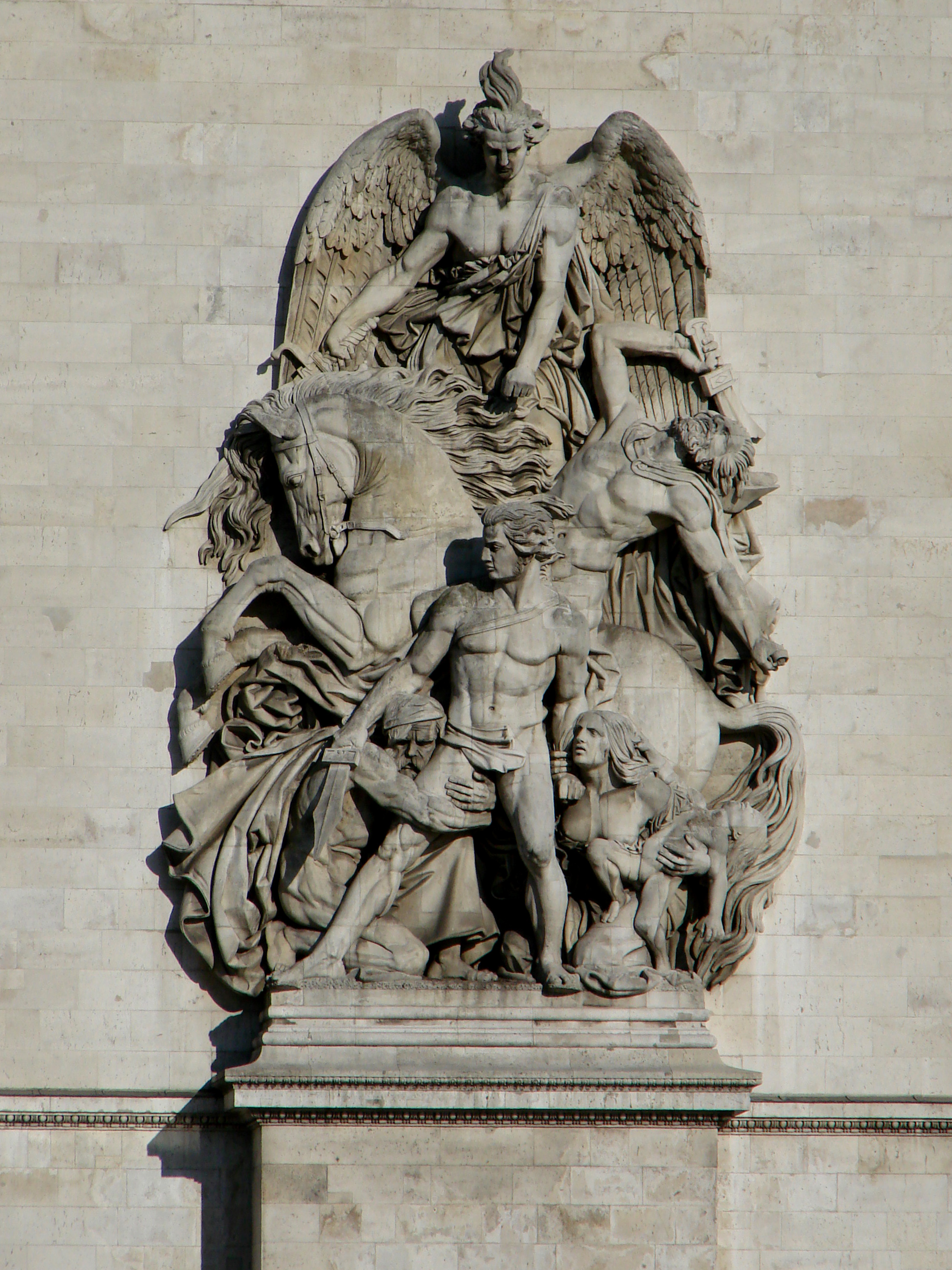
The Resistance, east facade of the Arc de Triomphe
