= Dieu =

Book by Victor Hugo

God
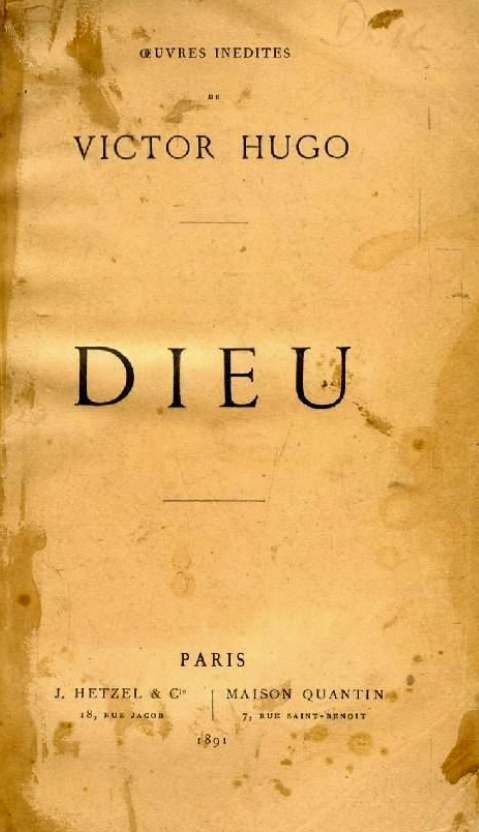
- Author: Victor Hugo
- Original title: Dieu
- Language: French
- Publisher: J. Hetzel
- Publication date: 1891
- Publication place: France
- Media type: Print

Dieu (French pronunciation: [djø], "God", 1891) is a long religious epic by Victor Hugo, parts of which were written between 1855 and 1862. It was left unfinished, and published after his death.

When it was rejected by his publisher in 1857, Hugo tried to integrate it into Petites Epopées (later La Légende des siècles), eventually announcing that it would form a companion work, along with La Fin de Satan. He had stopped work entirely by 1862, and while the result is fairly coherent, it is less complete than either of the other works, lacking even opening lines.

== Argument ==
The first part is entitled Ascension dans les Ténèbres ("Ascent into the Shadows") or Le Seuil du gouffre ("The Threshold of the Abyss"). The poet encounters a being which identifies itself as the Human Spirit: an embodiment of mediocrity, middlingness, of humanity en masse. After the spirit questions him on his motives for coming to this place, the narrator calls out into the void, and soon believes he can make out a multitude of indistinct faces blocking out the depths, from which he hears mysterious voices, possibly demonic, which provide worldly, agnostic, "sensible" advice at great length, and advise the human poet not to bother with ultimate questions ("L'absolu vous ignore. Ignorez-le.") When he reacts with indignation and despair, they respond with inscrutable laughter.

The second part, Dieu or L'Océan d'en haut ("The Ocean from Above"), depicts various religious and anti-religious points of view as beasts and animals, each emerging from the shadows to state its case.

- Atheism: the Bat
- Scepticism: the Owl
- Manichaeism: the Crow
- Paganism: the Vulture
- Mosaism: the Eagle
- Christianity: the Gryphon
- Rationalism: the Angel
- "What Still Has No Name": the Light

The third part, Le Jour ("Day"), is mostly unwritten and very brief, and concludes the work with the poet accepting an offer of enlightenment — which entails instant death.

== Development ==
A first draft, Solitudines Cæli, consisting of part of L’Océan d’en haut, was read to family and friends in early May 1855, the intention being to include it in Les Contemplations. According to the diary of Adèle Hugo, Vacquerie discouraged this idea, and when Les Contemplations was published it advertised Dieu as a separate work to come. On 7 June 1856, Hugo wrote to Enfantin that he had almost finished it, but would wait a while before publishing, on the grounds that it was too soon after his previous work. "I should like, God granting me the strength, to transport the rabble to the tops of certain peaks; not that I deceive myself as to whether the air is breathable for them. I want to give them a rest before imposing a new ascension." On 2 July, he was again dissuaded, and was asked by friends for some sort of prose work. Over the next few years he occasionally pondered the appropriate time for the publication of Dieu; around 1868-9 he made serious efforts to arrange the matter, but in August 1870, before returning to France, he entrusted the manuscript to a bank in Guernsey, and it was not retrieved until 1875. From that point onwards it was hardly referred to. The reasons for this abandonment are unclear, as he never changed his mind as to its merits, and the subject matter was no more controversial than that of other works.
