= Les Rayons et les Ombres =

1840 collection of poems by Victor Hugo

Beams and Shadows
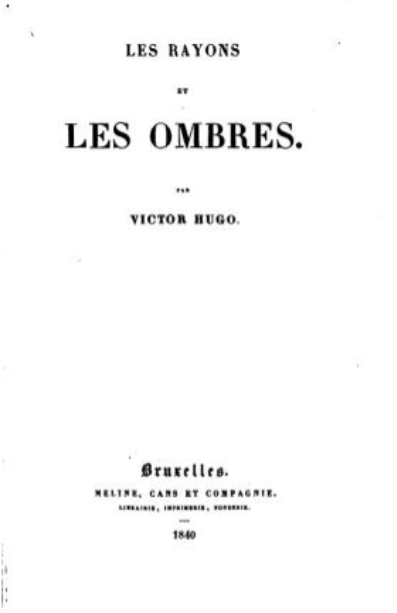
- Title page for Les Rayons et les Ombres (1840)
- Author: Victor Hugo
- Original title: Les rayons et les ombres
- Language: French
- Genre: poetry
- Publisher: Charpentier et Fasquelle
- Publication date: 1840
- Publication place: France
- Media type: Print
- Pages: 278

Les Rayons et les Ombres (French pronunciation: [le ʁɛjɔ̃ e lez‿ɔ̃bʁ], "Beams and shadows", 1840) is a collection of forty-four poems by Victor Hugo, the last collection to be published before his exile, and containing most of his poems from between 1837 and 1840.

One biographer (A. F. Davidson) noted that this book marks the first appearance of Hugo as "poet-prophet, whose function is to instruct kings and peoples about the problems of life." The critical success of Les Rayons may have brought about Hugo's election to the French Academy on 7 January 1841, when he took the seat of a deceased opponent.

The most famous poems are numbers 34 and 42, La Tristesse d'Olympio and Oceano Nox.

== Poems ==
=== Fonction du poëte ===
Fonction du poëte ("Poet's Role", 1839) is the first in the collection, and represents a dialogue in which an argument for aloofness is presented, and then refuted.

=== La Tristesse d'Olympio ===
La Tristesse d'Olympio ("The Sadness of Olympio", 1837) describes a man returning to Bièvres, Essonne to revisit memories of an old love affair. The poem is linked to Victor Hugo's relationship with Juliette Drouet, the manuscript bearing a dedication to her. Sainte-Beuve disapprovingly compared it to Alphonse de Lamartine's similar and similarly famous Le Lac.

=== Oceano Nox ===
Oceano Nox ("Night on the Ocean", 1836) ponders the horror of death by drowning, particularly when the death is ambiguous or unnoticed and thus unmourned. On 16 July 1836 Hugo watched a storm off the coast of Saint-Valery-sur-Somme, and this experience led him to write the poem. The title is from Virgil's Aeneid, Book II, line 250: Vertitur interea caelum, et ruit oceano nox. ("In the meantime, the sky revolves and night rushes from the ocean.") It is taken from Aeneas's description of the Trojans' misguided celebrations on the eve of their defeat.
