= Cain and His Race Cursed By God =

Sculpture by Antoine Étex

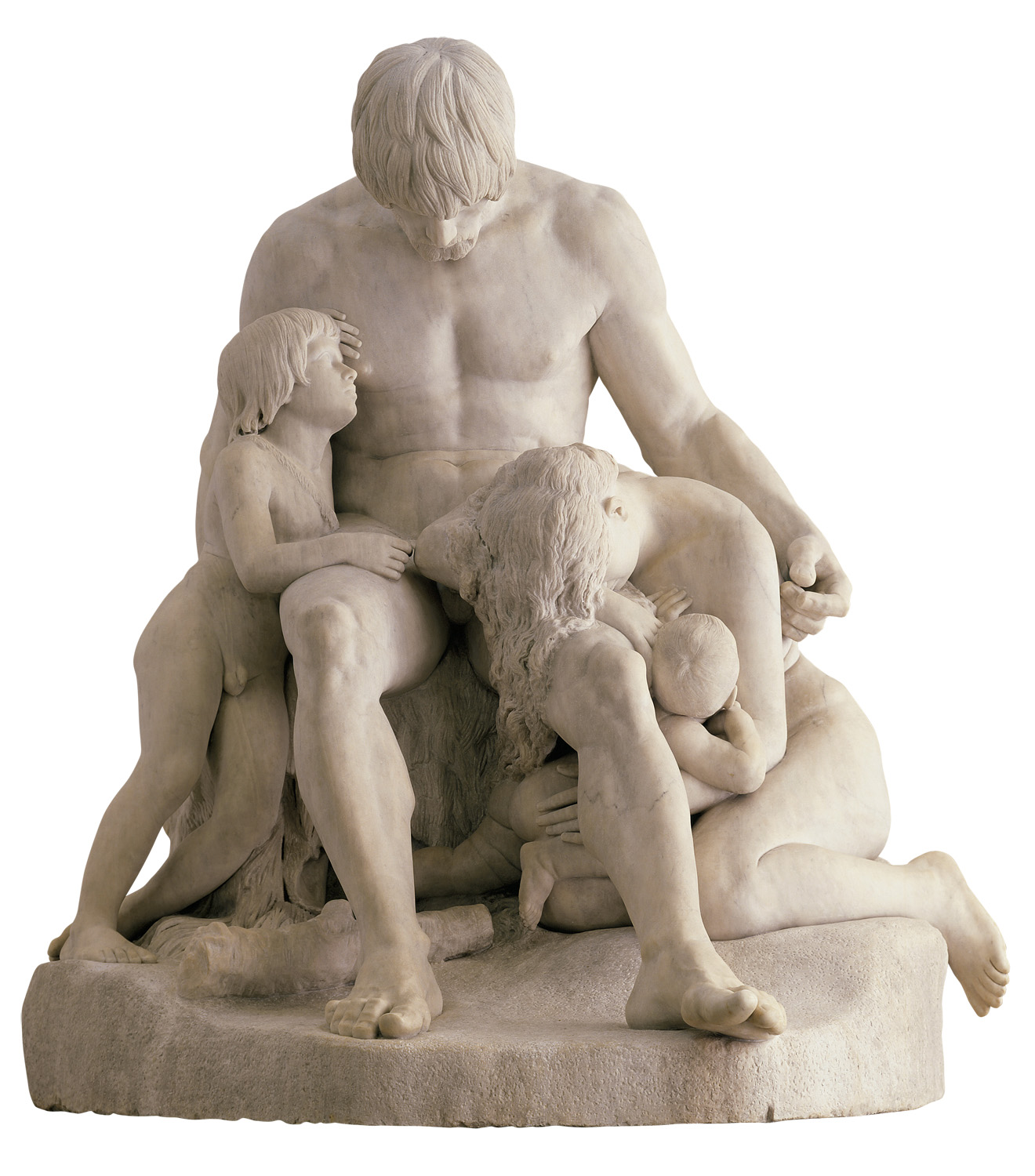
Cain and His Race Cursed By God (1833-1839) by Antoine Étex

Cain and His Race Cursed By God (French:Caïn et sa race maudits de Dieu) is an 1833-1839 marble sculpture by Antoine Étex. It was produced after an initial version in plaster which was made in Rome between 1831 and 1832, now in the Saint-Louis Chapel at the Pitié-Salpêtrière Hospital. It was inspired by the Biblical story of Cain's murder of Abel. It was first exhibited as a plaster version at the Paris Salon of 1833, where it proved very successful and put him at the forefront of the 1830s generation of Romantic sculptors. The marble version was finished in 1839 and is now in the Museum of Fine Arts of Lyon.

== Sources ==
- https://www.mba-lyon.fr/fr/fiche-oeuvre/cain-et-sa-race-maudits-de-dieu
