= Les Feuilles d'automne =

1831 poem collection by Victor Hugo

- Author: Victor Hugo
- Language: French
- Genre: Poetry
- Publication date: 1831
- Publication place: France
- Pages: 254

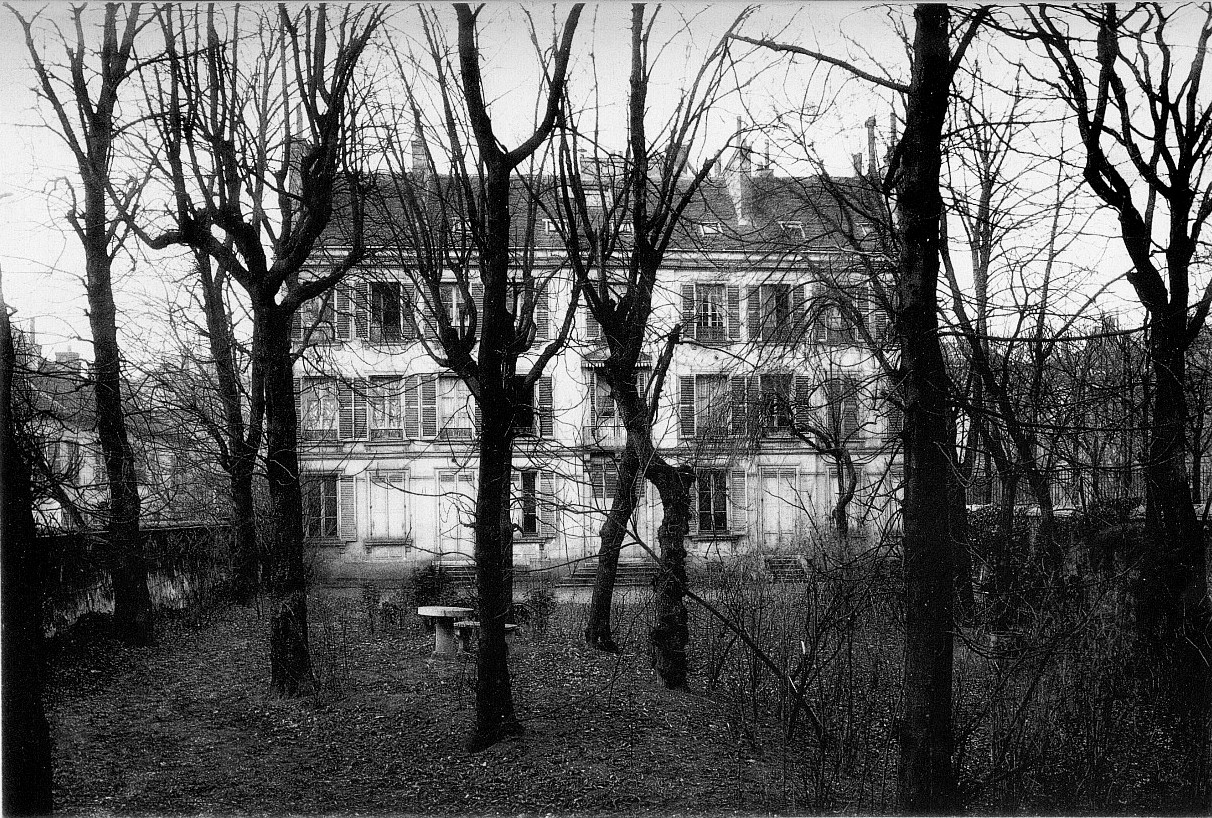
The house in Notre-Dame-des-Champs street where Victor Hugo wrote Les Feuilles d'automne.

Les Feuilles d'Automne (French pronunciation: [le fœj dotɔn], lit. 'Autumn Leaves') is a collection of poems written by Victor Hugo, and published in 1831. It contains a multitude of poems, six of which are especially known as Soleils Couchants.

== Extracts ==
Ce siècle avait deux ans (This century was two years old)

« Ce siècle avait deux ans ! Rome remplaçait Sparte
Déjà Napoléon perçait sous Bonaparte.
Et du premier consul déjà, par maint endroit,
Le front de l'empereur brisait le masque étroit. »

Le soleil s'est couché ce soir dans les nuées: (Soleils couchants) (The sun set tonight in the clouds)

« Le soleil s'est couché ce soir dans les nuées;
Demain viendra l'orage, et le soir, et la nuit;
Puis l'aube, et ses clartés de vapeur obstruées;
Puis les nuits, puis les jours, pas du temps qui s'enfuit !
Tous ces jours passeront; ils passeront en foule
Sur la face des mers, sur la face des monts,
Sur les fleuves d'argent, sur les forets où roule
Comme un hymne confus des morts que nous aimons.
Et la face des eaux, et le front des montagnes.
Ridés et non-vieillis, et les bois toujours verts
S'iront rajeunissant; le fleuve des campagnes
Prendra sans cesse aux monts le flot qu'il donne aux mers.
Mais moi, sous chaque jour courbant plus bas ma tête,
Je passe, et refroidi sous ce soleil joyeux,
Je m'en irai bientôt, au milieu de la fête,
Sans que rien manque au monde, immense et radieux ! »

== Poems ==
The collection Les Feuilles d'automne contains the following poems:

- À M. de Lamartine.
- À mes amis L. B. et S.-B.
- Melermemeler Esperanza
- Amis, un dernier mot.
- À Madame Marie M.
- À monsieur Fontaney.
- À ***, trappiste à La Meilleraye.
- À une femme.
- A un voyageur.
- Avant que mes chansons aimées.
- Bièvre.
- Ce qu'on entend sur la montagne.
- Ce siècle avait deux ans.
- Contempler dans son bain sans voiles.
- Banlieue ouest
- Dédain.
- Dicté en présence du glacier du Rhône.
- Laissez. – Tous ces enfants sont bien là.
- La pente de la rêverie.
- La prière pour tous.
- La prière pour tous (II).
- La prière pour tous (III).
- La prière pour tous (IV).
- La prière pour tous (V).
- La prière pour tous (VI).
- La prière pour tous (VII).
- La prière pour tous (VIII).
- La prière pour tous (IX).
- La prière pour tous (X).
- Lorsque l'enfant paraît.
- Madame, autour de vous tant de grâce étincelle.
- Oh ! pourquoi te cacher ?.
- Oh ! qui que vous soyez, jeune ou vieux.
- Ô mes lettres d'amour.
- O toi qui si longtemps.
- Où est donc le bonheur ?.
- Pan.
- Parfois, lorsque tout dort.
- Pour les pauvres.
- Quand le livre où s'endort chaque soir ma pensée.
- Que t'importe, mon cœur.
- Rêverie d'un passant à propos d'un roi
- Soleils couchants.
- Soleils couchants (II).
- Soleils couchants (III).
- Soleils couchants (IV).
- Soleils couchants (V).
- Soleils couchants (VI).
- Souvenir d'enfance.
- Un jour au mont Atlas.
- Un jour vient où soudain l'artiste généreux.
- Vois, cette branche est rude, elle est noire.
