= Odes et Ballades =

1828 collection of poems by Victor Hugo

Odes and Ballads
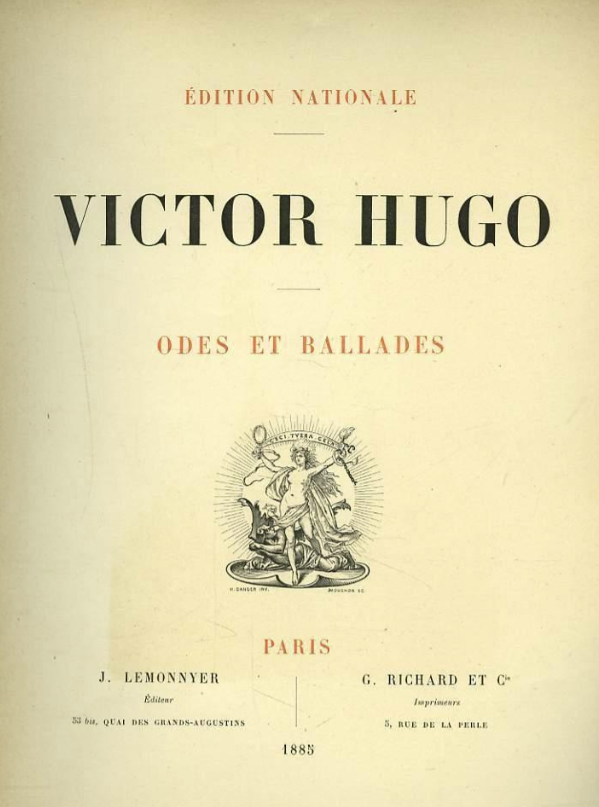
- Title page for Odes et Ballades (1885 edition)
- Author: Victor Hugo
- Original title: Odes et Ballades
- Language: French
- Publisher: Hector Bossange
- Publication date: 1828
- Publication place: France

Odes et Ballades (French pronunciation: [ɔd e balad]), published in 1828, is the most complete version of a collection of poems by Victor Hugo written and published between 1822 and 1828. It includes five books of odes and one book of ballads.

They are among his very earliest works and reflect the Catholic royalist views of his early twenties. He would write seven different prefaces for it, dated 1822, 1823, 1824, 1826, 1828, followed by one in 1853, at which time he was in self-imposed exile, and a final one in 1880. Hugo expresses a view of the difference between "order" and "regularity" which elevates the former on the basis that an irregularity in art can have its own logic, or order, and achieve effects impossible to regularity, or classical evenness.

The version of 1826 received a generally positive review from the 22-year-old Sainte-Beuve in the Globe (January 1827), and this review resulted in their friendship.

The collection includes Ode à la Colonne de la Place Vendôme, a response to the Austrian ambassador's decision in early 1827 to stop recognizing Napoleonic titles. First published in the Journal des débats, it represents the first praise of Napoleon in Hugo's work (but not a major political shift as he later claimed). It should be distinguished from the ode on the same subject in Les Chants du crépuscule.

== Bibliography ==
- The essential Victor Hugo. Translated by E. H. Blackmore, A. M. Blackmore. Oxford University Press, 2004
