= Les Voix intérieures =

Les Voix intérieures is a collection of poems by Victor Hugo published in 1837.
