= Religions et religion =

1880 poem by Victor Hugo

Religions et religion (transl. Religions and religion) is a book-length poem by Victor Hugo. The poem is a philosophical, theological, and political text on materialism and Christianity. It was first published in 1880 and received positive critical reviews.

== Sources ==
- Swineburne, Algernon Charles (1 June 1880). Morley, John (ed.). "Victor Hugo: Religions et religion". The Fortnightly Review. Vol. 28 (N.S.), no. 162. pp. 761–768. hdl:2027/coo.31924066514757 – via HathiTrust.
