= Le Pape =

Le Pape (French pronunciation: [lə pap], "The Pope") was a political tract in verse by Victor Hugo, supporting Christianity but attacking the rigid organization of the Catholic Church. Although written in 1874–5, it was not published until 29 April 1878, two months after the beginning of the papacy of Leo XIII. Leo's predecessor, Pius IX, had revealed deep divisions in the Church with his definition of the dogma of papal infallibility in July 1870. Hugo had long disliked Pius because of his support for Napoleon III, commenting in his diary:

Pope Pius IX is simple, mild-mannered, timid, fearful, slow-moving, negligent of his person. He usually goes around with two or three days' growth of beard, which gives him a disreputable appearance. Like Charles X, he emits more smiles than words. You'd think he was a country curé. [...] Just at present, Pius IX is spending his time writing a book on the mystery of the Immaculate Conception. [...] the immaculate conception of the Holy Virgin, grog with a pretty Englishwoman -- those are the things that occupy Pius IX in Rome and Louis Bonaparte in Paris. Those are the things that fill two brains on which the fate of Europe is hanging.

— Choses Vues, private notes from April 1850

Pius IX placed Les Misérables (1862) on the Index of Forbidden Books in 1864, where it remained until 1959. Notre-Dame de Paris had been banned in 1834.

The work, a closet drama, depicts an unnamed pope falling asleep, and having a dream in which he participates in a pageant of scenes which represent generic situations in human history. Through a sequence of discussions and soliloquies, the Pope reevaluates his beliefs, and concludes by giving a speech in which he condemns war and capital punishment, endorses the Republican ideals of Liberté, Égalité, Fraternité, and, in instructing the people to love one another, asserts that he abandons Rome for Jerusalem and Caesar for Christ.

The poem ends with an ironic envoi in which the Pope awakens and shakes off his momentary insight.
