= La Légende des siècles =

Poetry collection by Victor Hugo

The Legend of the Ages
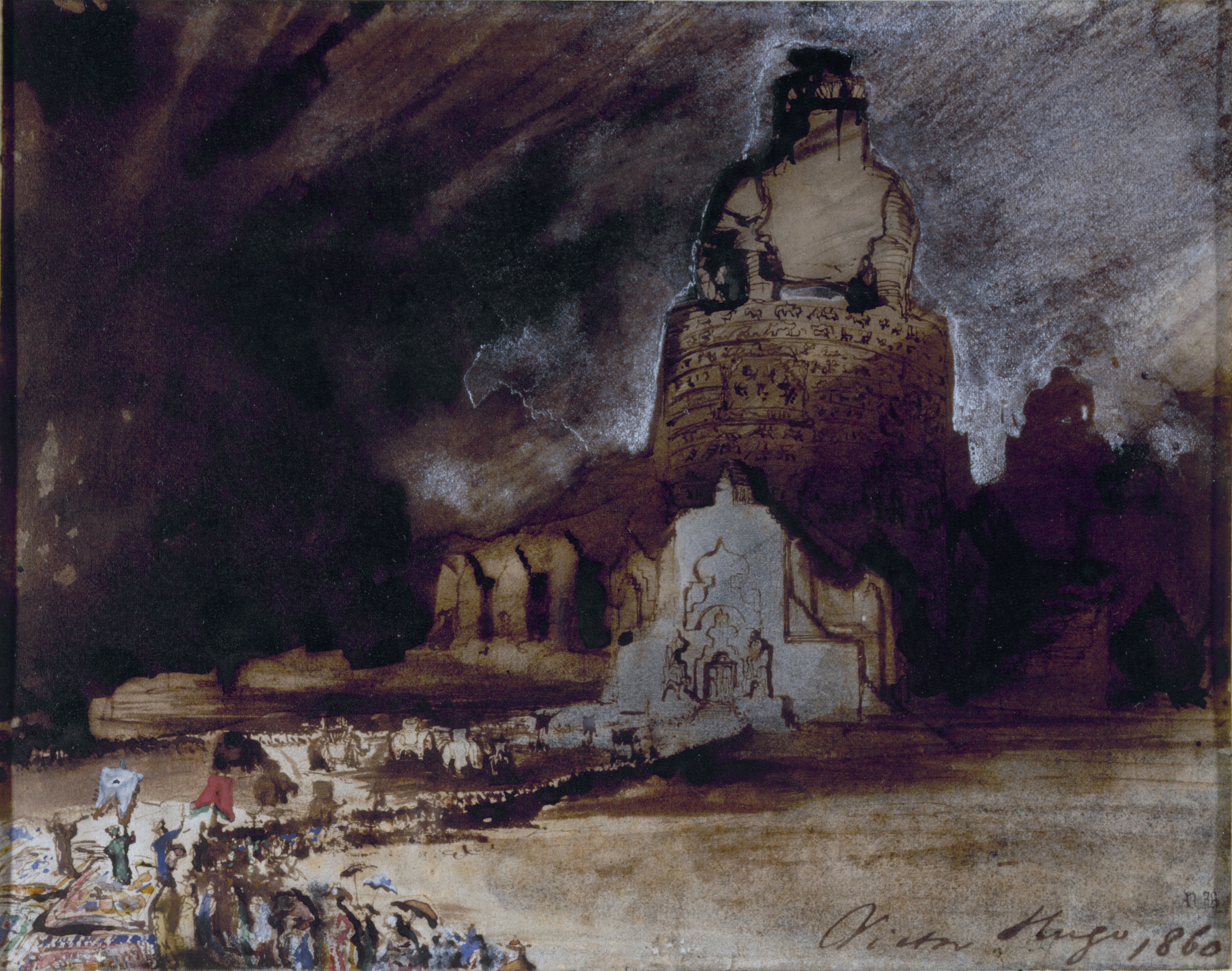
- Drawing made by Victor Hugo to illustrate La Légende des siècles
- Author: Victor Hugo
- Original title: La Légende des siècles
- Language: French
- Publisher: Lévy, Hetzel
- Publication date: 1859, 1877, 1883
- Publication place: France, Belgium
- Media type: Print

La Légende des siècles (French pronunciation: [la leʒɑ̃d de sjɛkl], lit. 'The Legend of the Ages') is a collection of poems by Victor Hugo, conceived as a depiction of the history and evolution of humanity.

Written intermittently between 1855 and 1876 while Hugo worked in exile on other projects, the poems were published in three series in 1859, 1877, and 1883. The book "is often considered the only true French epic".

The poems originate from Petites Epopées ("Little Epics"), from Hugo's 1848 notes.

== First Series ==
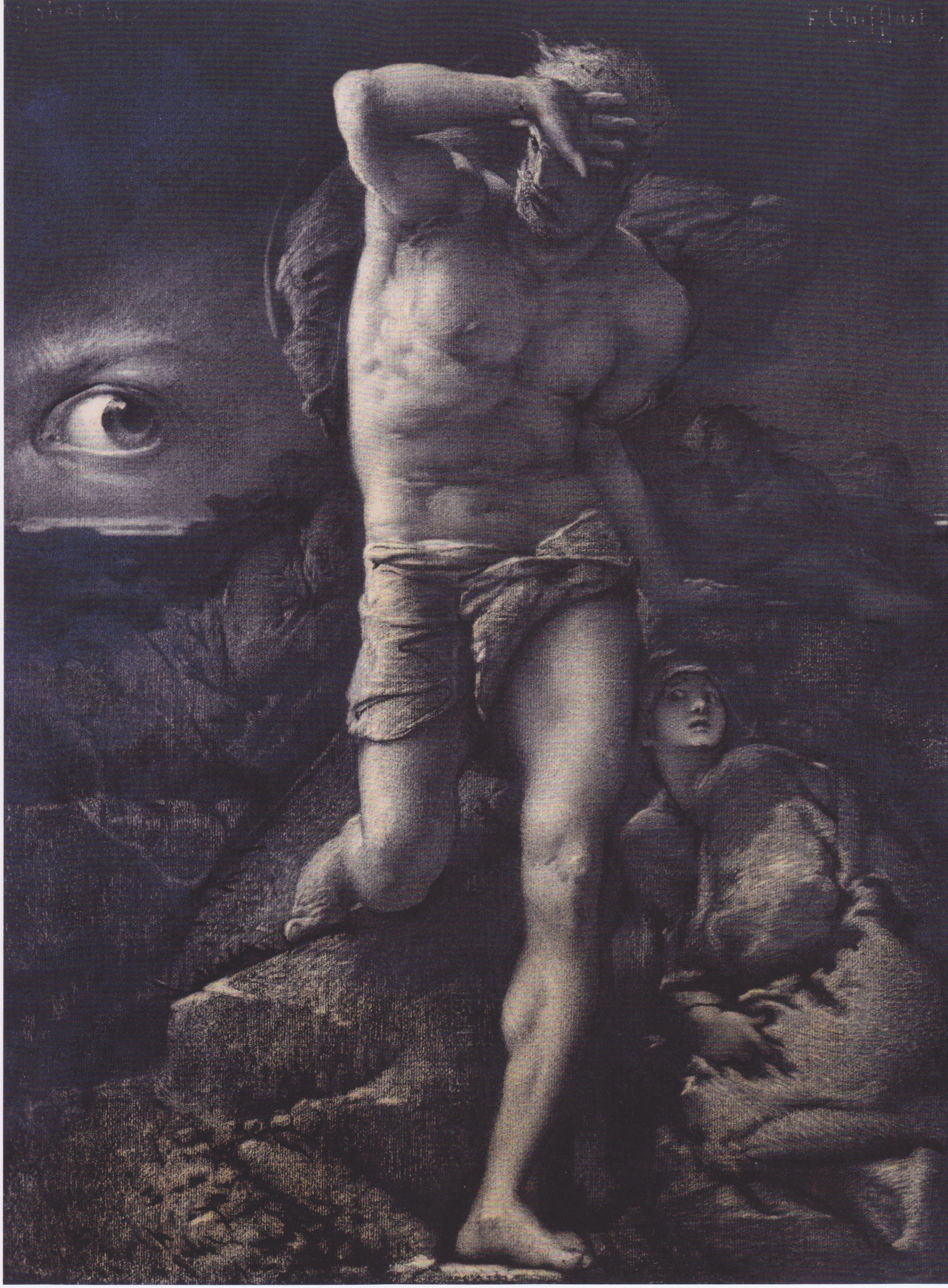
La Conscience, illustration by François Chifflart

The first series was published in two volumes on 26 September 1859 (see 1859 in poetry) in Brussels. In exile, Hugo dedicated it to his home country:

Livre, qu'un vent t'emporte
En France, où je suis né !
L'arbre déraciné
Donne sa feuille morte.

=== Contents ===
- Préface
- I. D'Ève à Jésus (Le sacre de la femme; La conscience; Puissance égale bonté; Les lions; Le temple; Booz endormi; Dieu invisible au philosophe; Première rencontre du Christ avec le tombeau)
- II. Décadence de Rome (Au lion d'Androclès)
- III. L'Islam (L'an neuf de l'Hégire; Mahomet; Le cèdre)
- IV. Le Cycle Héroïque Chrétien (Le parricide; Le mariage de Roland; Aymerillot; Bivar; Le jour des rois)
- V. Les Chevaliers Errants (La terre a vu jadis; Le petit roi de Galice; Eviradnus)
- VI. Les Trônes d'Orient (Zim-Zizimi; 1453; Sultan Mourad)
- VII. L'Italie — Ratbert
- VIII. Seizième siècle — Renaissance. Paganisme (Le Satyre)
- IX. La Rose de l'Infante
- X. L'Inquisition (Les raisons du Momotombo)
- XI. La Chanson des Aventuriers de la Mer
- XII. Dix-septième siècle, Les Mercenaires (Le régiment du baron Madruce)
- XIII. Maintenant (Après la bataille; Le crapaud; Les pauvres gens; Paroles dans l'épreuve)
- XIV. Vingtième siècle (Pleine mer — Plein ciel)
- XV. Hors des temps (La trompette du jugement)

== New Series ==
La Nouvelle Série was finally published on 26 February 1877 (see 1877 in poetry), Hugo's sixty-fifth birthday. Most of the contents date from 1859 and 1875–1877.

=== Contents ===
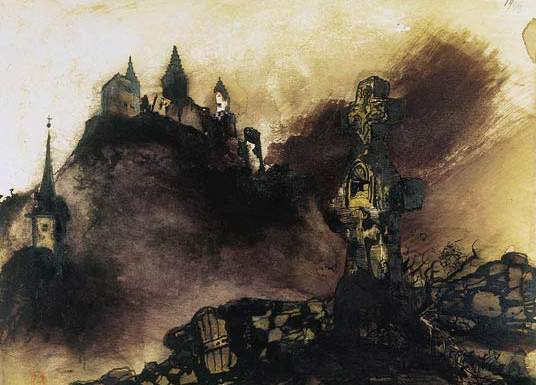
Illustration by Victor Hugo (1871)

- La vision d'où est sorti ce livre
- I. La Terre (La terre – hymne)
- II. Suprématie (Supremacy), poem inspired by the third part of the Kena Upanishad
- III. Entre géants et dieux (Le géant, aux dieux; Les temps paniques; Le titan)
- IV. La ville disparue
- V. Après les dieux, les rois (I : Inscription; Cassandre; Les trois cents; Le détroit de l'Euripe; La chanson de Sophocle à Salamine; Les bannis; Aide offerte à Majorien; II : L'hydre; Le romancero du Cid; Le roi de Perse; Les deux mendiants; Montfaucon; Les reîtres; Le comte Félibien)
- VI. Entre lions et rois (Quelqu'un met le holà)
- VII. Le Cid exilé
- VIII. Welf, Castellan d'Osbor
- IX. Avertissements et châtiments (Le travail des captifs; Homo duplex; Verset du Koran; L'aigle du casque)
- X. Les Sept merveilles du monde
- XI. L'Epopée du ver
- XII. Le Poëte au ver de terre
- XIII. Clarté d'âmes
- XIV. Les chutes (Fleuves et poëtes)
- XV. Le Cycle pyrénéen (Gaïffer-Jorge, duc d'Aquitaine; Masferrer; La paternité)
- XVI. La Comète
- XVII. Changement d'horizon
- XVIII. Le Groupe des Idylles
- XIX. Tout le passé et tout l'avenir
- XX. Un poëte est un monde
- XXI. Le Temps présent (La Vérité, lumière effrayée; Tout était vision; Jean Chouan; Le cimetière d'Eylau; 1851 — choix entre deux passants; Écrit en exil; La colère du bronze; France et âme; Dénoncé à celui qui chassa les vendeurs; Les enterrements civils; Le prisonnier; Après les fourches caudines)
- XXII. L'Élégie des fléaux
- XXIII. Les Petits (Guerre civile; Petit Paul; Fonction du l'enfant; Question sociale)
- XXIV. Là-haut
- XXV. Les Montagnes (Désintéressement)
- XXVI. Le Temple
- XXVII. À L'Homme
- XXVIII. Abîme

== Last Series ==
On 9 June 1883 the fifth and last part of La Légende des Siècles was published with the subtitle série complémentaire.

=== Contents ===
- Je ne me sentais plus vivant
- I. Les Grandes Lois
- II. Voix basses dans les ténèbres
- III. Je me penchai
- IV. Mansétude des anciens juges
- V. L'Échafaud
- VI. Inferi
- VII. Les quatre jours d'Elciis
- VIII. Les paysans au bord de la mer
- IX. Les esprits
- X. Le Bey outragé
- XI. La chanson des doreurs de proues
- XII. Ténèbres
- XIII. L'Amour
- XIV. Rupture avec ce qui amoindrit
- XV. Les paroles de mon oncle
- XVI. Victorieux ou mort
- XVII. Le cercle des tyrans
- XVIII. Paroles de Géant
- XIX. Quand le Cid
- XX. La vision de Dante
- XXI. Dieu fait les questions
- XXII. Océan
- XXIII. Ô Dieu, dont l'œuvre va plus loin que notre rêve

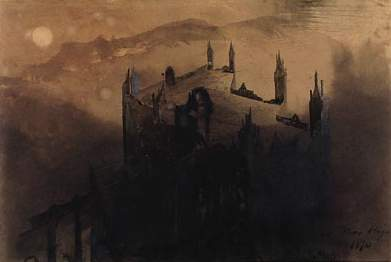
Illustration by Victor Hugo (1850)

== Collected edition ==
In September 1883, several months after the release of the Last Series, a "complete" edition was issued in which the three series are mixed together and reorganised according to a more or less chronological plan.

=== Contents ===
- Préface
- La vision d'où est sorti ce livre
- I. La Terre
- II. D'Ève à Jésus (Le sacre de la femme; La conscience; Puissance égale bonté; Les lions; Le temple; Booz endormi; Dieu invisible au philosophe; Première rencontre du Christ avec le tombeau)
- III. Suprématie
- IV. Entre géants et dieux (Le géant, aux dieux; Paroles de géant; Les temps paniques; Le titan)
- V. La ville disparue
- VI. Après les dieux, les rois (I : Inscription; Cassandre; Les trois cents; Le détroit de l'Euripe; La chanson de Sophocle à Salamine; Les bannis; Aide offerte à Majorien; II : L'hydre; Quand le Cid fut entré; Le romancero du Cid; Le roi de Perse; Les deux mendiants; Montfaucon; Les reîtres; Le comte Félibien)
- VII. Entre lions et rois (Quelqu'un met le holà)
- VIII. Décadence de Rome (Au lion d'Androclès)
- IX. L'Islam (L'an neuf de l'Hégire; Mahomet; Le cèdre)
- X. Le Cycle Héroïque Chrétien (Le parricide; Le mariage de Roland; Aymerillot; Bivar; Le jour des rois)
- XI. Le Cid exilé
- XII. Les Sept merveilles du monde
- XIII. L'Epopée du ver
- XIV. Le Poëte au ver de terre
- XV. Les Chevaliers Errants (La terre a vu jadis; Le petit roi de Galice; Eviradnus)
- XVI. Les Trônes d'Orient (Zim-Zizimi; 1453; Sultan Mourad; Le Bey outragé; La chanson des doreurs de proues)
- XVII. Avertissements et châtiments (Le travail des captifs; Homo duplex; Verset du Koran; L'aigle du casque)
- XVIII. L'Italie – Ratbert
- XIX. Welf, Castellan d'Osbor
- XX. Les quatre jours d'Elciis
- XXI. Le Cycle pyrénéen (Gaïffer-Jorge, duc d'Aquitaine; Masferrer; La paternité);
- XXII. Seizième siècle — Renaissance Paganisme (Le Satyre)
- XXIII. Je me penchai
- XXIV. Clarté d'âmes
- XXV. Les chutes (Fleuves et poëtes)
- XXVI. La Rose de l'Infante
- XXVII. L'Inquisition (Les raisons du Momotombo)
- XXVIII. La Chanson des Aventuriers de la Mer
- XXIX. Mansétude des anciens juges
- XXX. L'Échafaud
- XXXI. Dix-septième siècle, Les Mercenaires (Le régiment du baron Madruce)
- XXXII. Inferi
- XXXIII. Le cercle des tyrans
- XXXIV. Ténèbres
- XXXV. Là-haut
- XXXVI. Le Groupe des Idylles
- XXXVII. Les paysans au bord de la mer
- XXXVIII. Les esprits
- XXXIX. L'Amour
- XL. Les Montagnes (Désintéressement)
- XLI. Océan
- XLII. À L'Homme
- XLIII. Le Temple
- XLIV. Tout le passé et tout l'avenir
- XLV. Changement d'horizon
- XLVI. La Comète
- XLVII. Un poëte est un monde
- XLVIII. Le retour de l'Empereur
- XLIX. Le Temps présent (La Vérité, lumière effrayée; Tout était vision; Jean Chouan; Après la bataille; Les paroles de mon oncle; Le cimetière d'Eylau; 1851 – choix entre deux passants; Écrit en exil; La colère du bronze; France et âme; Dénoncé à celui qui chassa les vendeurs; Les enterrements civils; Victorieux ou mort; Le prisonnier; Après les fourches caudines; Paroles dans l'épreuve)
- L. L'Élégie des fléaux
- LI. Voix basses dans les ténèbres
- LII. Les pauvres gens;
- LIII. Le crapaud;
- LIV. La vision de Dante;
- LV. Les grandes Lois (+ Je ne me sentais plus vivant; Dieu fait les questions)
- LVI. Rupture avec ce qui amoindrit • LVII. Les Petits (Guerre civile; Petit Paul; Fonction du l'enfant; Question sociale)
- LVIII. Vingtième siècle (Pleine mer — Plein ciel)
- LIX. Ô Dieu, dont l'œuvre va plus loin que notre rêve
- LX. Hors des temps (La trompette du jugement)
- LXI. Abîme

== See also ==
- Cain (Cormon)
- Egregore
