= Amédée de Jallais =

French playwright, operetta librettist and chansonnier (1826–1909)

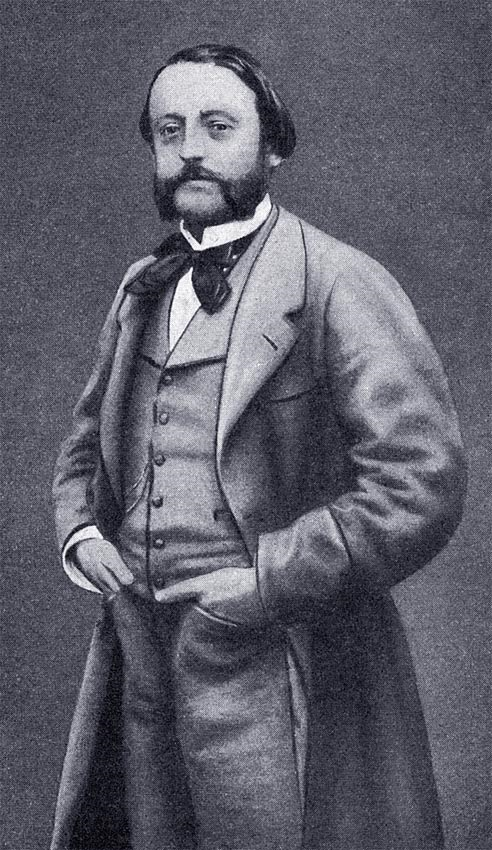
- Amédée de Jallais
- Born: Amédée-Jean-Baptiste de Font-Reaulx de Jallais; 17 December 1826; Saint-Germain-en-Laye
- Died: 31 January 1909 (aged 82); Paris
- Spouse: Eudoxie Laurent

Amédée de Jallais (17 December 1826 – 31 January 1909) was a 19th-century French playwright, operetta librettist and chansonnier.

== Biography ==
The son of a lieutenant colonel in the guards, he studied at the College Bourbon then entered in the insurance company La Nationale (1845–1850) as employee, a position he will leave to devote himself entirely to literature after the success of his comedy Un de perdu, une de retrouvée.

Collaborator of the Gazette des théâtres, then of the Messager des théâtres, he became managing director of the Théâtre des Délassements-Comiques (1871) then after the blaze of this theatre on 22 May 1871, of the Théâtre des Menus-Plaisirs. Administrator dof the Théâtre Déjazet (1874–1875), general secretary of the Théâtre de la République (1897), he married the actress Eudoxie Laurent in 1862.

He wrote more than two hundred plays which were presented on the most important Parisian stages of the 19th century: Théâtre de la Porte-Saint-Martin, Théâtre du Vaudeville, Théâtre des Folies-Dramatiques etc.

== Works ==
- Capitaine... de quoi ?, vaudeville in 1 act, with Xavier Eyma, 1850
- Un de perdu, une de retrouvée, comédie-vaudeville in 1 act, 1850
- Le Colporteur, comédie-vaudeville in 2 acts, with Henry Vannoy, 1851
- La Course aux pommes d'or, comédie-vaudeville in 1 act, with Frédérick Lemaître, 1851
- Les Giboulées, vaudeville un 1 act, with Armand-Numa Jautard, 1851
- Quand on va cueillir la noisette, vaudeville in 1 act, with De Kock, 1851
- Le Renard et les raisins, comédie-vaudeville in 1 act, with Eyma, 1851
- Un Mari tombé des nues, vaudeville in 1 act, 1852
- Une nuit sur la scène, compte mal rendu des Nuits de la Seine, in 2 scenes, with Charles Blondelet, 1852
- Pendant l'orage, comédie-vaudeville in 1 act, 1852
- Le Bonhomme Dimanche, revue-féerique in 4 acts and 20 tableaux, with Charles Potier and Jules Renard, 1853
- Le jour de la blanchisseuse, vaudeville in 1 act, 1853
- Un Pacha dérangé, vaudeville in 1 act, with Gabet, 1853
- Un Pistolet qui ne veut pas partir, vaudeville in 1 act, 1853
- Allez-vous-en, gens de la noce, pochade in 1 act, mingled with couplets, with Charles Gabet, 1854
- Sur la scène et dans la salle miroir des théâtres de Paris, 2 vols., 1854
- Ah ! quel plaisir d'être garçon !, scène de la vie privée, 1854
- Allez aux 500 diables, imbroglio de la féerie des 500 diables, with Cabot, 1854
- L'Alma, à-propos patriotique mingled with couplets, in 2 tableaux, with Adolphe Guénée, 1854
- Sous un bec de gaz, scènes de la vie nocturne, in one night, 1854
- Catastrophe épouvantable arrivée au puisatier Giraud et à son compagnon Jala, with Cabot, 1854
- La Question d'Occident, à propos... de bottes... orné de cuirs et d'un pas presque espagnol, in 1 act, with Édouard Cadol, 1854
- La Corde du pendu, vaudeville in 2 acts, with Charles Cabot and Édouard Cadol, 1854
- La Mauvaise aventure d'une pauvre parfumeuse taillée en pièce pour le théâtre de la Gaîté, with Cabot, 1854
- Jacqueline Doucette, vaudeville in 1 act, with Cabot, 1855
- Nicodème sur la terre, vaudeville in 1 act, with Cabot, 1855
- Le Médecin sans enfants, ou le don Juan de Vincennes et ce qu'on perd quand on a une paire de pères, parody in 2 tableaux, with Cabot, 1855
- Le Boulanger a des écus, drame-vaudeville in 3 acts, with Thiéry, 1856
- Les Cocasseries de la danse, scène comique, 1856
- Estelle et Némorin, bucolique musicale in 1 act, 1856
- Les Mésaventures de Mandrin, méli-méla-mélodrame, with Cabot, 1856
- Le Guetteur de nuit, opérette-bouffe in 1 act, with Léon Beauvallet, 1856
- Madame Roger Bontemps, vaudeville in 1 act, with Clairville, 1856
- Ninon et Ninette, vaudeville in 1 act, with Beauvallet, 1856
- Manon de Nivelle, vaudeville in 3 acts, 1856
- Les Cosaques, drama in 8 tableaux, with Charles Cabot, 1857
- Suivez le monde !, 1857 revue in 3 acts and 20 tableaux, with Ernest Blum and Flan, 1857
- Les Poètes de la treille, song in 3 periods, 1857
- Le Gardien des scellés, vaudeville in 1 act, with Clairville and Mercier, 1857
- Le Poignard de Léonora, play in 2 acts and 4 tableaux, mingled with song, with Clairville, 1857
- Rompons !, opérette-bouffe in 1 act, with Jautard, 1857
- Le Borgne à la représentation de l'Aveugle, ou le Père de l'aveugle aveuglé par un aveuglément aveugle, 1857
- Allez vous asseoir, 1858 revue in 3 acts and 16 tableaux, preceded by As-tu vu la lune ?, prologue in 2 parts, with Jules Renard, 1858
- La Dette de Jacquot, operetta in 1 act, 1858
- Pan, pan ! c'est la fortune !, comedy in 1 act, with Charles Varin and Henri Thiéry, 1858
- Le Roi de la gaudriole, operetta in 1 act, with Charles Bridault and Alexandre Flan, 1858
- Un duo de capons, rencontre nocturne, saynète musicale in 1 act, 1858
- Fra Diavolino, operetta in 1 act, with Charles Bridault, 1858
- Les Talismans de Rosine, vaudeville in 2 acts, with Flan, 1858
- Le Naufrage de La Pérouse, drama in 5 acts and 9 tableaux, with Adolphe d'Ennery and Thiéry, 1859
- La Course aux canards, vaudeville in 3 canards, with Thiéry, 1859
- Les Premières armes de Fanfan la Tulipe, vaudeville in 1 act, with Clairville, 1859
- Ot' toi d'la !, ronde, 1859
- Les Enfants du travail, pièce populaire mingled with song, in 3 acts and 9 tableaux, with Clairville, 1859
- La Toile, ou Mes quat'sous, revue of 1859, in 3 acts and 20 tableaux, preceded by Le Royaume de Comus, prologue in 2 parts, with Renard, 1859
- Chamarin le chasseur, comédie-vaudeville in 1 act, with Varin and Thiéry, 1860
- La Nouvelle Madame Angot au sérail de Constantinople, play in 3 small acts, 1860
- Les Chasseurs de pigeons, vaudeville in 3 acts, with Paul Avenel, 1860
- Quelle mauvaise farce !, vaudeville in 1 act, with Alexandre Guyon and Gustave Harmant, 1860
- L'histoire d'un drapeau racontée par un zouave, lament in too many couplets, with Cabot, 1860
- Modiste et modeste, vaudeville in 1 act, with Avenel, 1860
- Les Recruteurs, opéra-comique in 3 acts and 4 tableaux, 1861 (with Alphonse Vulpian 1795?-1829)
- Ce Scélérat de Poireau !, vaudeville in 1 act, with Clairville and Pol Mercier, 1862
- Le Minotaure, vaudeville in 1 act, with Clairville and Henry de Kock, 1862
- De Paris en Chine, ou Je ne suis pas Tissier, voyage en 4 stations, with Varin and Thiéry, 1863
- Le Carnaval des canotiers, vaudeville in 4 acts, with Thiéry and Adolphe Dupeuty, 1864
- Le Petit journal, play in 4 acts and 12 tableaux including a prologue, 1864
- On lit dans l'Akhbar..., vaudeville in 1 act, with William Busnach, 1864
- Zut... au berger !, revue de l'année 1864, in 3 acts et 7 tableaux, including a prologue, with Flan, 1864
- En classe ! Mesdemoiselles, folie-vaudeville in 1 act, with Dupeuty, 1864
- Les Supplices des femmes, revue fantaisiste in 3 acts and 6 tableaux, with Victor Koning, 1865
- Les Vieux glaçons, parodie des Vieux garçons , in 2 acts, in 4 tableaux, with Flan, 1865
- L'Événement, grande actualité in 5 acts and 12 tableaux, 1866
- Gabriel Lambert, drama in 5 acts and a prologue, with Alexandre Dumas, 1866
- Nos bonnes villageoises, parody in 2 acts and 3 tableaux, 1866
- La Bonne aventure, ô gué !, revue of the year 1867, in 3 acts and 8 tableaux, 1867
- Le Royaume de la bêtise, fantaisie in 3 acts and 8 tableaux, 1867
- L'Héritage du postillon, opérette in 1 act, with Francis Tourte, 1867
- A la barque, à la barque !, revue of the year 1868, in 3 acts and 10 tableaux, 1868
- La Fleur des saphis, fantaisie-vaudeville in 2 acts, 1869
- La Chiffonnière !, chanson réaliste, 1869
- Madame Angot et ses demoiselles, musical fantasy in 1 act, 1873
- Bobino vit encore, revue in 3 acts, 1873
- Loup, y es-tu ?, great revue of the year 1876, in 4 acts and 8 tableaux, 1876
- Paris-mondain, ronde, 1880
- Fenêtres et jalousies, operetta in 1 act, 1882
- La chanson des Écus, operetta in 1 act, 1883
- Fenêtres et jalousies, operetta en 1 act, 1883
- Une date immortelle !, souvenir d'un grand jour, with Alphonse Lemonnier, 1884
- Le Petit Spahi, operetta, with Louis Péricaud, 1885
- La Question tonkinoise, saynète bouffe, with Péricaud, 1885
- Il reviendra, revue in 3 tableaux of the year 1887, with Guillaume Livet, 1887
- Les Sabines, operetta in 1 act, 1890
- Confections pour dames, operetta in 1 act, 1899
- Dans la Déche, operetta in 1 act, undated
- Le Médaillon d'Yvonne, opérette de salon in 1 act, undated

== Bibliography ==
- Edmond Antoine Poinsot, Dictionnaire des pseudonymes, 1869, p. 242
- Pierre Larousse, Grand Dictionnaire universel du XIXe siècle, 1er supplément, 1878
- Henry Lyonnet, Dictionnaire des comédiens français, 1911, p. 407
