= Gustave Harmant =

French playwright (1824–1864)

Gustave Dardoize (18 April 1824 – 18 November 1864), known as Gustave Harmant, was a 19th-century French playwright from Paris.

Harmant was managing director of the Théâtre de la Gaité and later of the Théâtre du Vaudeville (1864-1865). His plays were presented on the most important Parisian stages of his time: Théâtre du Vaudeville, Théâtre du Palais-Royal, Théâtre de l'Odéon etc.

== Plays ==
- 1852 : L'Original et la Copie, comedy in 1 act and in verses, with Armand-Numa Jautard
- 1852 : Le Parapluie de Damoclès, comedy in 2 acts mingled with couplets, with Charles Varin and Ernest Lehmann
- 1854 : Une partie de cache-cache, comédie en vaudevilles in 2 acts, with Lehmann
- 1854 : Quand on n'a pas le sou..., vaudeville in 1 act, with Arsène de Cey
- 1855 : 55 francs de voiture, vaudeville in 1 act, with Alfred Delacour
- 1857 : Théâtre d'Elbeuf... Elbeuf dans de beaux draps, à-propos vaudeville in one act
- 1860 : Le Capitaine Georgette, vaudeville in 1 act, with Delacour and Paul Siraudin
- 1860 : Quelle mauvaise farce !, vaudeville en 1 act, with Alexandre Guyon and Amédée de Jallais
- 1867 : Observations tendant à la suppression du droit des indigents sur les spectacles; followed by courte réponse à M. Husson directeur général de l'assistance publique à Paris, with Hippolyte Cogniard, Eugène Déjazet, Hippolyte Hostein and Montigny

== Bibliography ==
- Edmond de Goncourt, Jules de Goncourt, Journal; Mémoires de la Vie Littéraire: 1891-1896, 1956, t.1, (p. 821-823); t.2, (p. 134)
- Louis Bouilhet, Maria Luisa Cappello, Lettres à Gustave Flaubert, 1996, (p. 26)
