= Georges Fath =

Théodore Georges Fath (Paris, 22 January 1818 – Maisons-Laffitte, 1900) was a 19th-century French playwright, illustrator and writer as well as Jacques Fath's great-grandfather.

== Biography ==
He first studied sculpture and became known in 1840 with a drama, La Femme de l'émigré.

Apart from his own works, Fath illustrated the Contes d'une vieille fille à ses neveux by Delphine de Girardin, with Gustave Doré for Michel Lévy (1866), the Historiettes véritables pour les enfants de quatre à huit ans by Zulma Carraud (1879) and Jeux et exercices des jeunes filles by Madame de Chabreul for Hachette (1890), Jocrisse et sa sœur by Pierre-Jules Hetzel (1878) or else Un petit-fils de Robinson by Philibert Audebrand in collaboration with Aloys Fellmann for the éditions Lefèvre (1878).

He wrote feuilletons, novels and short stories. Je also translated the tales by Christoph von Schmid (1852) for the Magasin des enfants.

== Works ==
- 1840: La Femme de l'émigré, two-act drama mingled with songs, with Adolphe Guénée
- 1844: De Charybde en Scylla, vaudeville
- 1845: Les nains célèbres depuis l'antiquité, jusques et y compris Tom-Pouce, Havard
- 1847: Partie à trois, one-act comedy, mingled with couplets, with Eugène Nus and Auguste Follet
- 1849: La mort de Chatterton, drama in verse, Havard
- 1855: La Prison de Schlusselbourg
- 1856: Le Dernier jour d'une monarchie, five-act drama, with Auriol
- 1863: Les Brûleurs de villes
- 1865: La sagesse des enfants, proverbes, Hachette
- 1867: Gredin de Pigoche !, one-act operetta, with Michel Masson
- 1868: Pierrot à l'école, Magasin d'éducation et de récréation, Hetzel
- 1869: Le Paris des enfants, petit voyage à travers la grande ville, Hachette
- 1871: Marie la petite étourdie, Bernardin-Béchet
- 1873: Les Contes du vieux docteur, Ducrocq
- 1874: Le Paris des enfants. Petit voyage à travers la grande ville, text and illustrations, Hachette
- 1875: Perdus au milieu de Paris, histoire de trois orphelin, Ducrocq
- 1877: Le Bon cœur de Lucette, Bernardin-Béchet
- 1877: L'Éducation d'Aline, Ducrocq
- 1878: Un drôle de voyage, Hetzel
- 1880: Pierrot à l'école et chez son ami Paillasse, 55 vignettes by Fath, text by Fath and un Papa, Hetzel
- 1881: Prisonniers dans les glaces, Plon
- 1882: Les cataractes de l'Obi, voyage dans les steppes sibériennes, Plon
- 1883: Les Études de Petit-Pierre, text and drawings, Delagrave
- 1885: La Sagesse des enfants, proverbes, text and illustrations, Hachette
- 1888: Bernard, la gloire de son village, Hachette

== Bibliography ==
- Gustave Vapereau, Dictionnaire universel des contemporains, 1870, p. 654
- Pierre Larousse, Nouveau Larousse illustré, supplément, 1906, p. 225
- Robert Sabatier, Histoire de la poésie française, Poésie du XIXe siècle, 1977, p. 336
- Valérie Guillaume, Jacques Fath, 1993, p. 22
- Jean-Marie Embs, Philippe Mellot, 100 ans de livres d'enfant et de jeunesse: 1840-1940, 2006, p. 255
- Francis Marcoin, Librairie de jeunesse et littérature industrielle au XIXe siècle, 2006, p. 128
