= Charles Potier =

French actor and playwright (1806–1870)

Charles Joseph Édouard Potier, called Charles (Bordeaux, 1806 – Asnières-sur-Seine, 28 April 1870) was a 19th-century French actor and playwright.

A son of Charles-Gabriel Potier, Charles was an actor at the Théâtre des Variétés (1826), the Théâtre du Palais-Royal, then at the Théâtre des Folies-Dramatiques. His plays were presented on the most significant Parisian stages of his time including the Théâtre des Délassements-Comiques, the Théâtre des Folies-Dramatiques, and the Théâtre Déjazet.

== Works ==
- Les 20000 francs, drama in one act mingled with songs, with Auguste-Louis-Désiré Boulé, 1832
- La Fille du bourreau, folie-vaudeville in one act, with Boulé, 1833
- Le Peloton de fil, moralité in 1 act, mingled with couplets, 1834
- Parce que, ou la Suite de Pourquoi ? , comédie en vaudevilles in one act, with Boulé, 1835
- Fanchette, ou l'Amour d'une femme, drama-vaudeville in two acts, with Boulé, 1836
- Le Facteur, ou la Justice des hommes, drama in five acts, with Boulé and Charles Desnoyer, 1838
- La Sœur de l'ivrogne, drama-vaudeville in one act, with Désiré Gautier, 1839
- L'Amie et l'amant, ou La confiance du mari, comédie en vaudevilles in one act, with Hippolyte Rimbaut, 1840
- Le Bijoutier de Nuremberg, ou Elle me console, drama in three acts, with Adolphe Guénée, 1840
- Le Maître à tous, comedy in two acts mingled with singing, with Antony Béraud, 1840
- Léon, Georges et Marie, ou les Deux amours, comédie en vaudevilles in one act, with Félix Dutertre de Véteuil, 1841
- Le Marchand d'habits, drama in five acts, with Desnoyer, 1841
- Les Deux Joseph, comédie en vaudevilles in one act, with Nyon, 1842
- Tic, tac ! tic tac ! ou les Deux mariées, folie-vaudeville in one act, 1843
- À la belle étoile, comédie en vaudevilles in one act, with Édouard Brisebarre, 1844
- Estelle et Némorin, pastorale bouffonne in two acts, mingled with singing, with Michel Delaporte, 1844
- Le Mal du pays, drama-vaudeville in three parts, with Brisebarre, 1846
- Le Retour du conscrit, comédie en vaudevilles in one act, 1846
- Bal et bastringue, comédie en vaudevilles in three acts, with Brisebarre, 1847
- Deux loups de mer, comédie en vaudevilles in one act, with Brisebarre, 1847
- Sans dot !, comédie en vaudevilles in one act, with Brisebarre, 1847
- Tantale, comédie en vaudevilles in one act, with Brisebarre, 1847
- Élevés ensemble, comédie en vaudevilles in one act, with Narcisse Fournier, 1848
- L'Été de la Saint-Martin, comedy in one act, mingled with couplets, with Brisebarre, 1848
- Le Voyage de Nanette, drame-vaudeville in three acts and four tableaux, with Brisebarre, 1848
- Adrienne de Carotteville, ou La reine de la fantaisie, parody in un act of the 17th, 33th, 78th, 93rd, 96th, 112th, 129th, and 168th episodes of the Juif errant, with Eugène Nyon and Brisebarre, 1849
- Les Fredaines de Troussard, comédie en vaudevilles in one act, with Brisebarre and Commerson, 1849
- Qui se dispute s'adore, proverb in one act, with Henry de Kock, 1850
- Un Coin du Palais de Cristal, à-propos-vaudeville in one act and two tableaux, with Théodore Faucheur, 1851
- Une Soirée agitée, comédie en vaudevilles in one act, with Faucheur, 1852
- Le Bonhomme Dimanche, revue-féerique in four acts and twenty tableaux, with Amédée de Jallais and Jules Renard, 1853
- Le Carton vivant, comédie en vaudevilles in two acts, with Alexandre Flan, 1853
- Un Homme seul, comédie en vaudevilles in one act, with Faucheur, 1853
- Un Monsieur seul, comédie en vaudevilles in one act, with Faucheur, 1853
- Où peut-on être mieux ?, comédie en vaudevilless in one act, with Paulin Deslandes, 1853
- Le Forgeron de Gretna-Green, comédie en vaudevilles in two acts, with Flan, 1854
- Où passerai-je mes soirées ?, comédie en vaudevilles in one act, with Gaston de Montheau, 1854
- Voilà ce qui vient de paraître, revue of the year 1854, in three acts and 16 tableaux, with Adolphe Guénée, 1854
- La Dame aux trois maris, comédie en vaudevilles in one act, with Guénée, 1855
- Dzing ! Boum ! Boum !, revue de l'Exposition, in one acts and sixteen tableaux, with Guénée, 1855
- L'Enfant du petit monde, comédie en vaudevilles in three acts, with Guénée, 1855
- Vous allez voir ce que vous allez voir, revue of the year 1855, in three acts and 16 tableaux, with Guénée, 1855
- Allons-y gaiment, revue of the year 1856, in three acts and fourteen tableaux, with Guénée, 1856
- Les Dragées du 16 mars, à-propos mingled with couplets, with Guénée, 1856
- Si j'étais riche, comédie en vaudevilles in one act, with Guénée, 1856
- En avant, marche !, revue of the year1857, in three acts and sixteen tableaux, La Guerre des saisons, prologue, with Guénée, 1857
- Petit Bonhomme vit encore, féerie in fifteen tableaux, 1857
- Le Premier feu, comédie en vaudevilles in one act, with Guénée, 1857
- Jacquot Renchéri, parody in three tableaux, of the Fils naturel, with Émile Abraham, 1858
- La Jeunesse du jour, play mingled with songs, in three acts and six tableaux, with Eugène de Fère, 1858
- Tout Paris y passera, revue of the year 1858, in three acts and fourteen tableaux, preceded by Paris sur scène, prologue, with Guénée, 1858
- Vingt ans ou la Vie d'un séducteur, drame-vaudeville in five acts, with Deslandes, 1858
- L'Éventail de Géraldine, comédie en vaudevilles in one act, with Ernest Mouchelet and Edgard Chanu, 1859
- Le Doigt dans l’œil, revue of the year 1860, in three acts and twenty tableaux, with Dunan Mousseux, 1860
- Les Leçons de Betzy, comédie en vaudevilles in one act, with Abraham, 1860
- Les Piliers de café, drame-vaudevilles in four acts, with Abraham and Eugène Hugot, 1861
- Les Trois ivresses, comédie en vaudevilles in one act, 1863

== Bibliography ==
- Pierre Larousse, Grand dictionnaire universel du XIXe siècle, 1866, (p. 1,520)
- Alfred Mézières, Lettres, sciences, arts: Encyclopédie universelle du XXe, 1908, (p. 209)
- Henry Lyonnet, Dictionnaire des comédiens français (ceux d'hier), 1910
- Guy Dumur, Histoire des spectacles, 1965, (p. 1,893)
