= Arsène de Cey =

French playwright and novelist

- Born: François-Arsène Chaise de Cahagne; 2 March 1806; Thiers, Puy-de-Dôme, France
- Died: 20 November 1887 (aged 81); Paris, France
- Occupations: Playwright, novelist

Arsène de Cey (real name François-Arsène Chaise de Cahagne; 2 March 1806 – 20 November 1887) was a French playwright and novelist.

A civil servant at the Ministry of Public Works (1858), his plays were performed on the most important Parisian stages of the 19th century: Théâtre du Gymnase dramatique, Théâtre du Vaudeville, Théâtre de la Gaîté etc.

== Works ==
=== Novels ===
- 1833 : La Fille du curé, roman de mœurs
- 1833 : Jean le bon apôtre, roman de mœurs
- 1835 : Sagesse, ou la Vie d'étudiant, roman, 4 vols.
- 1836 : La Jolie Fille de Paris, 4 vols.
- 1836 : Le Premier Pas, roman

=== Theatre ===
- 1837 : Vingt ans après, comedy in 1 act, mixed with distincts, with Paul Duport
- 1842 : Quand on n'a rien à faire, comedy-vaudeville in 2 acts, with Lockroy
- 1848 : Le Grand-papa Guérin, comedy-vaudeville in 2 acts, with Laurencin
- 1840 : Les Caprices, comedy-vaudeville en 1 act, with Léon Halévy
- 1848 : La Fiancée du prince, comedy-vaudeville in 3 acts, with Antonin d'Avrecourt and Ernest-Georges Petitjean
- 1848 : Monsieur le duc et Madame la duchesse, comedy-vaudeville in 2 acts
- 1850 : Le Mari d'une Camargo, comedy-vaudeville in 2 acts, with Laurencin
- 1852 : L'Ami du roi de Prusse, vaudeville in 2 acts, with Charles Varin
- 1854 : Quand on n'a pas le sou..., vaudeville in 1 act, with Gustave Harmant

== Bibliography ==
- Louis Gustave Vapereau, Dictionnaire universel des contemporains, 1858, p. 364 (Lire en ligne)
- Joseph Marie Quérard, Gustave Brunet, Pierre Jannet, Les supercheries littéraires dévoilées: A-E, 1869, (p. 684)
- La Grande encyclopédie, inventaire raisonné des sciences, des lettres et des arts: par une société de savants et de gens de lettres, vol.10, 1886, (p. 175)
