= Journal des dames et des modes =

French fashion magazine

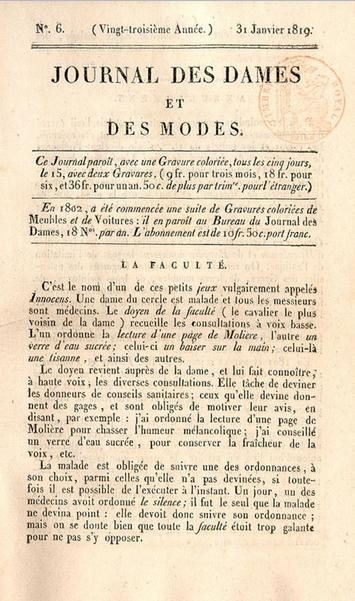
- Title page of an 1819 edition
- Founded: 20 March 1797
- Ceased publication: 19 January 1839

Journal des dames et des modes, was a French fashion magazine, published between 20 March 1797 and 19 January 1839. Until the 1820s, the magazine had almost international monopoly as a channel of French fashion worldwide.

== History ==
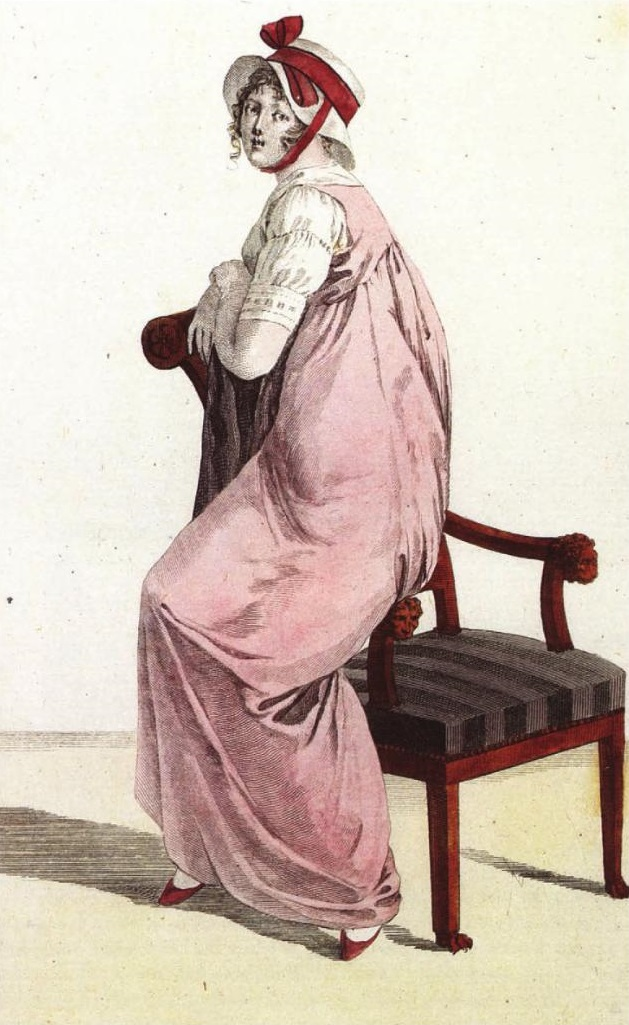
Chapeau à la Paméla - Costume Parisien, 1801-2

It was the second oldest fashion magazine published in France, replacing its predecessor the Cabinet des Modes (1785–1793) after the fall of Maximilien Robespierre. During most of its existence, it had near monopoly in the fashion world as the channel of French fashion in France as well as internationally, particularly during the Napoleonic age.

The magazine was edited by Pierre de la Mesangere [fr], who was its main journalist for most of its existence. It was issued every five days, with eight pages of text and one or two coloured copperplates (fashion plates). It also contained descriptions of society life, poetry, theatre reviews and fiction. During the French Revolution (1789–1799), the Journal des dames et des modes featured “political clothing”, among them a tunic called juive, named after Jews who were granted equal rights in France in 1791. Other fashions included were high-waisted gowns with low necklines, cross-laced "Greek" slippers, Kashmiri shawls, poke bonnets, redingotes and reticules.

The magazine was generously treated by Napoleon I as he viewed fashion as an important French industry, and preferred it as the organ of French fashion instead of fashion dolls, which he banned because of his fear that they could be used to conceal secret messages. It was relatively inexpensive and affordable, and popular in almost all the Western world: from Paris to Boston, Britain, Holland, Italy, Belgium, Germany and Russia. Despite the unpopularity of France during the Napoleonic Wars, French fashion was still popular which ensured the fashion magazine's international success. There were however many national fashion magazines produced with Journal des dames et des modes as its model.

From the 1820s, the dominance of the magazine was broken when the French fashion magazine industry exploded with a number of rivalling magazines, such as the Petit courrier des dames (1821-1868), Le Follet (1829-1892), La Mode (1829-1854) and Le Journal des demoiselles (1833-1922). The Journal des dames et des modes was discontinued in 1839.

A set of fashion plates from the magazine, held in the collection of The Morgan Library & Museum, have been digitised in collaboration with Columbia University and are available online on the Style Revolution. The Genesee Country Village and Museum has also digitized a large number of plates from the periodical.

== Contributors ==
- Agathe-Pauline Caylac de Caylan
- Marie de L'Épinay
- Louis-Marie Lanté [fr]
- Pierre de la Mesangere [fr]
- Carle Vernet

== Later magazine ==
Another magazine with the same name, Journal des dames et des modes, was published in 1912–14.

== Gallery ==
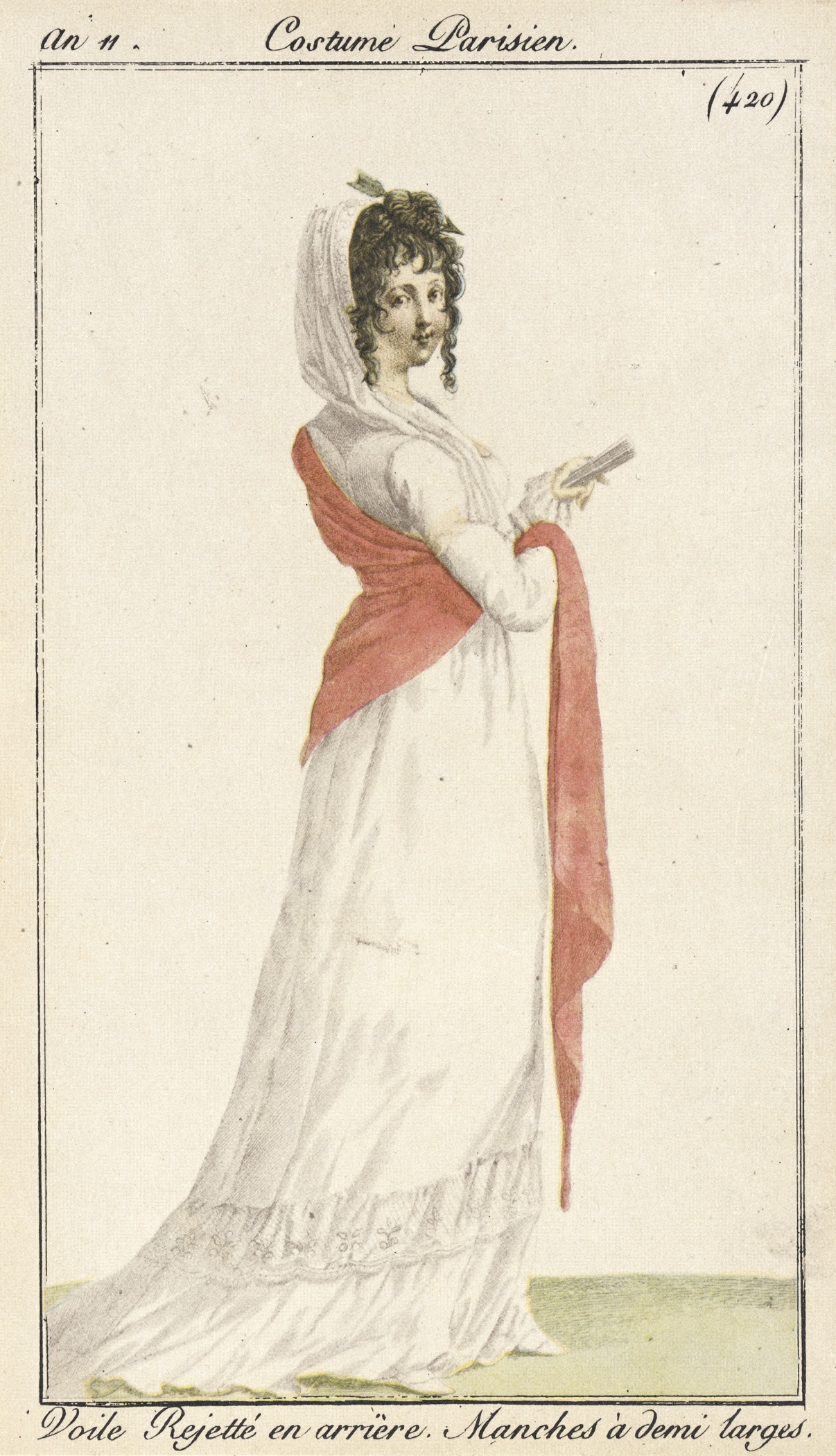
Journal des dames et des modes, 1803.

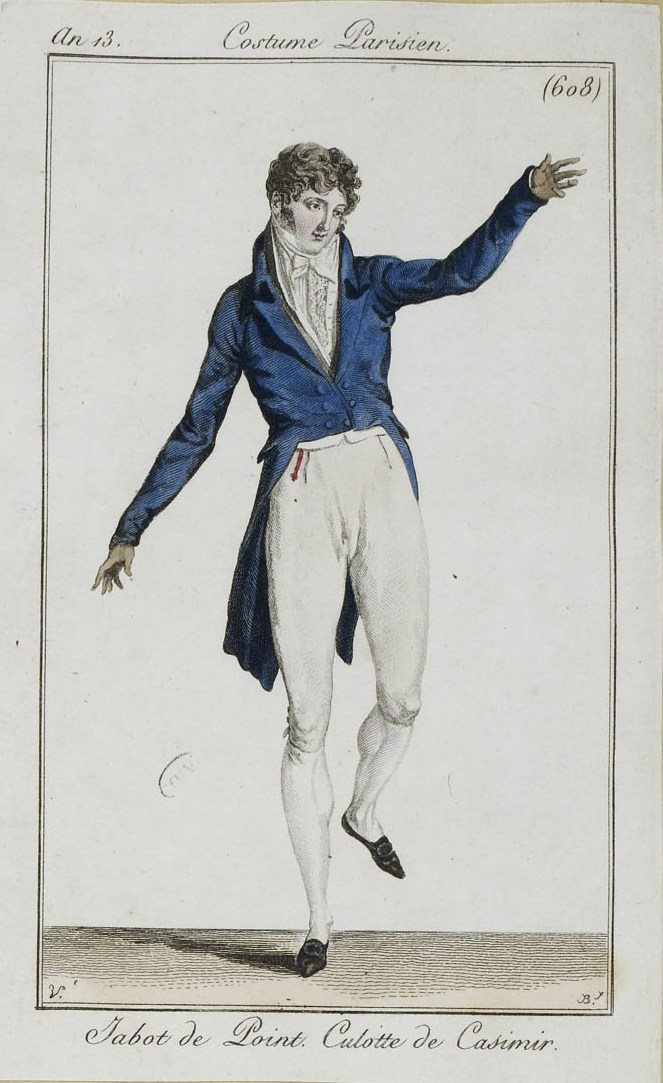
Costume Parisien No.608 1804.

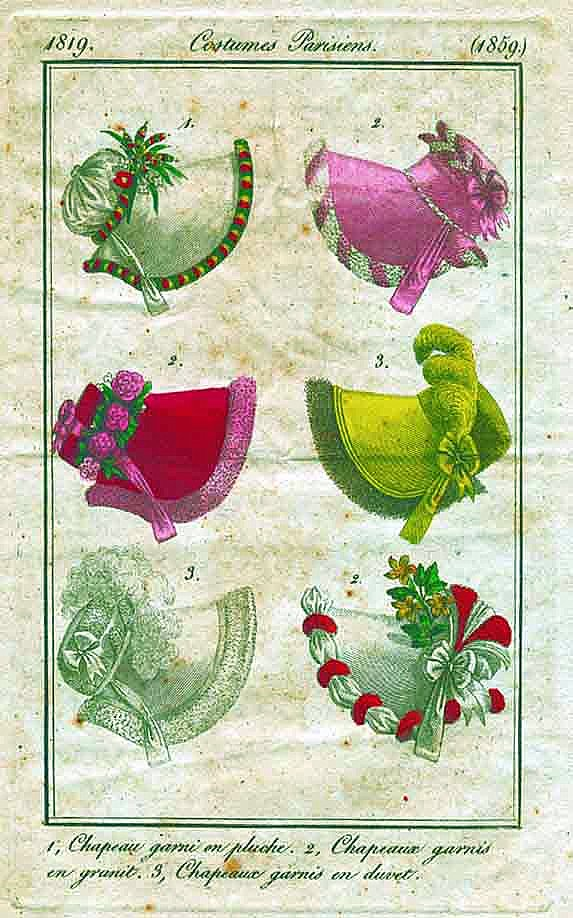
Schutenhut, 1819.

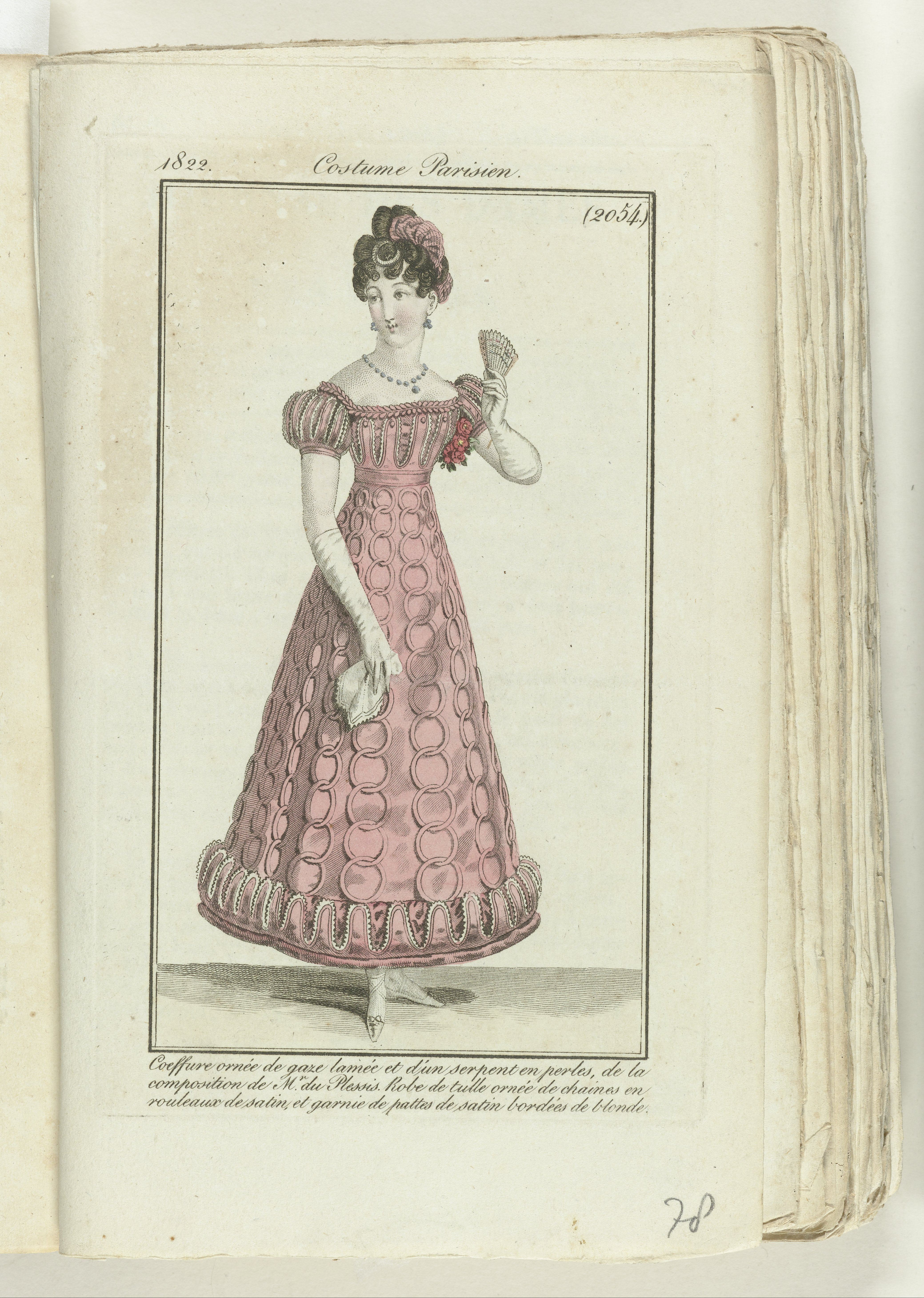
Journal des Dames et des Modes, 1822.

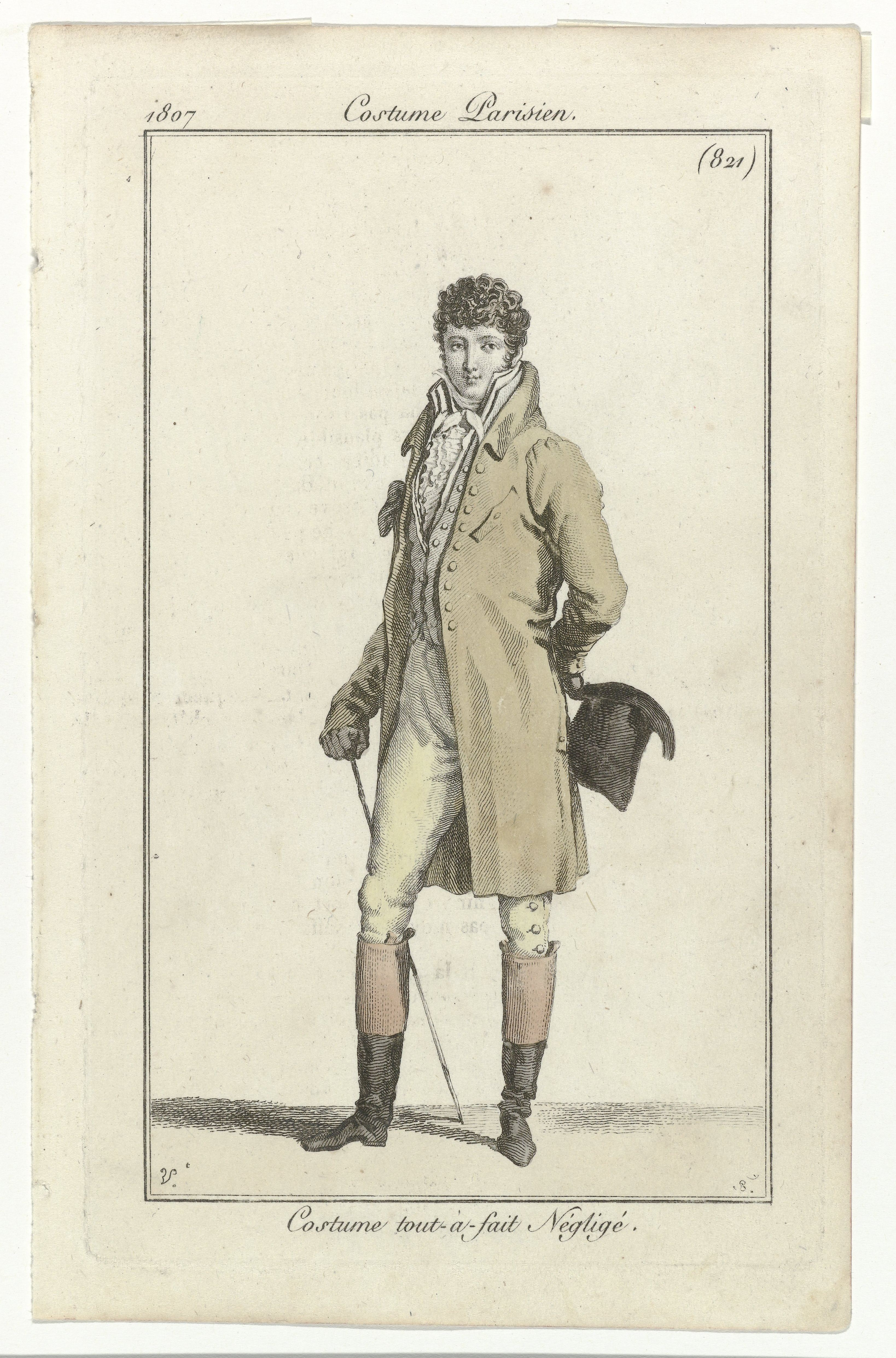
Journal des Dames et des Modes, 15 July 1807.
