= Marie de L'Épinay =

French femme de lettres

- Born: Ève Olivia Angela Josépha de Bradi; 1802 Rebréchien, France
- Died: 30 January 1864 (aged 61–62) Paris, France
- Occupation: Femme de lettres
- Relatives: Agathe-Pauline Caylac de Caylan (mother)

Marie de L'Épinay, real name Ève Olivia Angela Josépha de Bradi, baronne de Bruchez (Rebréchien, 1802 – Paris, 30 January 1864) was a French femme de lettres.

== Biography ==
The daughter of Agathe-Pauline Caylac de Caylan who held a literary salon and was a contributor to the Journal des dames et des modes from 1818, Marie L'Épinay was often invited by the Duchess of Berry to the court balls.

Her husband, the Swiss officer Stephen Bruchez of Épinay, preferred she took care of their children, rather than writing. Yet, she published numerous verses, stories, novels of manners, plays and newspaper articles, including in 1835, several for the Journal des Femmes.

She also wrote the music for a few romances and in 1836, she worked at Biographie des femmes auteurs contemporaines. Famous under her name as well as under the pseudonyms Ève de Bruchez or Ève de Bradi (sometimes Brady), she owned and was chief editor of the Journal des dames et des modes (5 July 1836 – 19 January 1839).

From 1839, she was responsible for the importante chronique de mode of other magazines for women such as La Sylphide (January 1840 – 1847) and Paris Élégant (1845), as well as the chronique littéraire of the La Corbeille de Mariage (1847–1848) and the Journal des Jeunes Personnes. In 1846 she also wrote for L’Écho français.

== Works ==
- 1836: Deux Souvenirs, Olivier
- 1837: Deux Études
- 1838: Les Femmes célèbres
- 1844: Rosette, 2 vols., Magen
- 1844: Aimer et mourir, feuilleton
- 1844: L'École d'un fat, comedy in 1 act and in prose, with Armand-Numa Jautard
- 1845: Berthilde, 2 vols., Magen
- 1846: La femme du diable, feuilleton
- 1846: Les Trois Grâces, Paris
- 1847: Les Beautés de l'âme, Janet
- 1850: Les quatre fils Aymon, de Vigny
- 1850: Sœur Agathe, de Vigny
- 1852: Blanche, de Vigny
- 1852: La cave aux diamants, de Vigny
- 1860: Clara de Noirmont, Leclercq
- 1864: Les Contes de nuit, Dentu
- undated: Cours de morale

== Sources ==
- Joseph Marie Quérard, La littérature française contemporaine: XIXe siècle, 1852, (p. 96)
- Edmond-Denis De Manne, Nouveau dictionnaire des ouvrages anonymes et pseudonymes, 1862, (p. 16)
- Gustave Vapereau, L'année littéraire et dramatique, 1865, (p. 374)
- Pierre Larousse, Larousse du XIXe siècle, Épinay (Ève-Olivia-Angéla de Bradi, baronne de Bruchez, connue en littérature sous le pseudonyme de Marie de L')
- Annemarie Kleinert, Le Journal des dames et des modes ou la conquête de l'Europe féminine (1797-1839), 2001, (p. 230-233)
