= Dunan Mousseux =

French journalist and playwright (1829–1886)

Antoine Gadon better known as Dunan Mousseux (1829 – Paris, January 1886) was a 19th-century French journalist, chansonnier and playwright.

A director of the Halle aux habits, a shop in the Passage du Grand-Cerf, he launched in theater and had several of his plays presented at Théâtre des Délassements-Comiques and Théâtre des Folies-Dramatiques.

A journalist by the Vieux père Grégoire, monthly, political and charivanic, founder in 1851 of the Pierrot, journal-programme des fêtes et des spectacles and of the Porte-Voix in 1856, he was editor of the paper Le Sans Gêne in 1861.

== Works ==
- 1846–1857: Chansons diverses
- 1848: L'Échafaud du peuple
- 1848: Le Bœuf gras du suffrage universel
- 1848: Tableau populaire. Les Trois jours
- 1848: Vive la République !, chant patriotique
- 1849: En prison !!!
- 1857: Complainte !!!
- 1858: Le Royaume du poète, comédie-vaudeville in 3 acts, drawn from songs by Béranger, with Édouard Montagne
- 1859: L'Orgueil, drama in 5 acts, with François Llaunet
- 1861: Le Doigt dans l’œil, review of the year 1860, in 3 acts and 20 tableaux, with Charles Potier
- 1865: Mes Mémoires, étude de mœurs parisiennes, rondeau
- 1865: Les Blanchisseuses de fin, play in 5 acts mingled with songs, with Hippolyte Lefebvre
- 1865: La Famille Mirliton, parodie-vaudeville of la Famille Benoiton in 5 acts, with Alexandre Flan and Alexis Bouvier
- 1866: Le Pays latin, drama in 5 acts mingled with song after the novel by Henry Murger, with Frédéric Voisin
- 1866: Les Cinq francs d'un bourgeois de Paris, comédie-vaudeville in 5 acts, with Victorien Sardou and Jules Pélissié
- 1872: Rabagas, comedy in 5 acts, in prose, with V. Sardou

== Bibliography ==
- Georges d' Heylli, Dictionnaire des pseudonymes, 1869, p. 93-94 (Read online)
- Pierre Larousse, Nouveau Larousse illustré, 1898, p. 880
- Jean-Yves Mollier, Philippe Régnier, Alain Vaillant, La production de l'immatériel, 2008, p. 175-176
