= Charles Delange =

French chansonnier

Charles Delange ( –1871) was a 19th-century French chansonnier.

He has written many songs of the nineteenth century repertoire as well as an operetta in 1856, Un monsieur bien servi! presented at Théâtre Déjazet.

== Works ==
- Les Aventures d'une cane, ditty curiosité musicale, music by Louis Clapisson, 1834
- Le Bureau de placement !, humorous scene, music by Charles-François Plantade, 1843
- Le Tombeau des secrets !, ditty, music by Plantade, 1843
- Beloiseau le modèle !, humorous scene, music by Pierre-Julien Nargeot, 1844
- Ce que disent les Cloches !, romance, music by Plantade, 1844
- Gennaro ou l'Enfant du môle, mélodie, music by Abel d'Adhémar, 1844
- Monsieur mon-filleul !, ditty, music by Nargeot, 1844
- Le Capitaine Craquefort !, voyage de circumdivagation, music by Plantade, 1846
- Le Galop de la vie !, music by Plantade, 1846
- Histoire de Cendrillon racontée par le caporal Gobin à son retour d' Afrique, sur l'air de Ramonez-ci, ramonez-là !, ditty, music by Plantade, 1846
- Le Souffleur du théâtre !, ditty with spoken ad libitum, music by Plantade, 1846
- Les Rues de Paris ou le nouveau conducteur parisien !, song, music by Plantade, 1846
- Riquet à la houppe ou l'avantage d'avoir du toupet !, on the tune of Cadet-Roussel est bon enfant, music by Plantade, 1846
- Le petit Chaperon rouge ou les vrais amis sont les gens impolis !, on the tune of Bonjour mon ami Vincent !, music by Plantade, 1846
- Les Désagréments, de Pyrame et Thisbe dans leurs amours !, on the tune of Catacoua, music by Parizot, 1847
- Le Jugement de Salomon ou l'enfant changé en nourrice, cause célèbre sur l'air de Allez-vous en, gens de la noce, music by Albert Clément, 1847
- Le petit Poucet ou l'art de s'enrichir !, music by Plantade, 1847
- Album de huit mélodies pour voix et piano, with Hippolyte Guérin, music by Clapisson, 1848
- Le Corricolo, music by Clapisson, 1848
- Ma Cunégonde ou l'heure du berger !, sérénade, music by Lhuillier, 1848
- La Tirelire à Jacquot, music by Clapisson, 1848
- Tout tourne au moulin, music by Clapisson, 1848
- La Poste aux Commissions ou les Relais d'hommes, scène comique, lyrics and music, 1848
- Album de dix mélodies pour voix et piano, with Xavier Eyma and Francis Tourte, 1849
- L'Ane-à-Baptiste ou Moucheron à la représentation du Prophète, parody on the tune of Catacoua, 1849
- Avez-vous vu mon Parapluie !, perquisition désespérée, music by Plantade, 1849
- Azor ou le bichon de la marquise !, ditty, music by Plantade, 1849
- Le Couvreur du Théâtre Français, ou Adrienne Lecouvreur, racontée par Mme Godiche, chanson comique on the tune of Nicodème, dans la lune ou l'autre pour la p'tit' Isabelle, 1849
- La Fée aux blonds cheveux !, fabliau, music by Lhuillier, 1849
- La Fête à Suzon !, song in three couplets, music by Lhuillier, 1849
- Le Mari au bal, duettino, 1849
- Pataud !, music by Lhuillier, 1849
- L'Âne savant ou le plus amoureux de la société !, music by Charles-François Plantade, 1850
- Le Nom de ta mère, music by Clapisson, 1850
- Le Perroquet indiscret !, ditty, music by Plantade, 1850
- Les Soupirs de Maclou !, ditty, music by Plantade, 1850
- Angélique et Médor, Épopée chevaleresque on the tune Il pleut, il pleut bergère, 1851
- Le Bout de l'oreille, fantaisie, on the tune j'ai vu la manière en passant, 1851
- Le Caporal aux ombres chinoises !, scène comique, 1851
- Le Furet du bois joli, ditty, 1851
- Le Marchand forain, air bouffe, music by Clapisson, 1851
- Si j'étais t'invisible !, ditty, music by Lhuillier, 1852
- Le Bal des fleurs !, fabliau, music by Edmond Lhuillier, 1853
- Le Duel de Binochet !, ditty, music by Plantade, 1853
- Le Groom à la broche ou les abominations du château de Kercassbec !, ditty, music by Plantade, 1853
- L'Hirondelle du quartier ou la boite aux lettres !, music by Plantade, 1853
- Les Bâtons de vieillesse, story, 1854
- La Dot du berger Richard, ditty, music by Henrion, 1854
- La Mère aux Oiseaux, ditty, 1854
- Une Feuille de rose !, romance, music by Edmond Lhuillier, 1854
- Pierrot le poltron !, scène comique, music by Lhuillier, 1854
- Une Chaumière et son cœur, ditty, music by Émile Durand, 1855
- A bas les almanachs !, ditty, music by Émile Durand, 1856
- La fête de l'orpheline, romance, music by Durand, 1856
- Un monsieur bien servi!, operetta, music by Nargeot, 1856
- À la Houppe ! Là, houp, là ! Ou le coiffeur à la mode, music by Nargeot, 1857
- Les noms propres, ditty, music by Durand, 1857
- L'Arbre mort, melody, music by Durand, 1857
- Le Bonheur ignoré, romance, music by Durand, 1857
- La Boutique à Jean-Pierre, humorous ditty, music by Durand, 1857
- L'Écheveau de fil, bluette, music by Durand, 1857
- Une Femme à vapeurs ! Locomotive conjugale à haute pression, music by Parizot, 1857
- L'incomparable, Mirobolanpouff, parade charlatanesque, music by Vialon, 1857
- Jeanne s'amuse en chemin, ditty, music by Clapisson, 1857
- J'trouve ça bête ! (Petite revue pour rire), 1857
- Manon, Manette ! Lamentation champêtre, music by Parizot, 1857
- Othello et Desdémone !, duo bouffe, music by Henrion, 1857
- Le Père Pince-tout, garde champêtre !, humorous scene, music by Parizot, 1857
- Le Père Sabremioche ! Bousculade amicale d'un vieux grognard, music by Parizot, 1857
- Un Puits de mélodie !, ode-scène, music by Parizot, 1857
- La Vedette surprise, music by Durand, 1857
- L'Anglais champêtre !, humorous scene, music by Henrion, 1858
- Marchand de coco !, ditty, music by Parizot, 1858
- Capable de tout !, village ditty, music by Parizot, 1858
- Le Chevalier du lustre !, music by Parizot, 1858
- Cœur d'or, historiette, music by Henrion, 1858
- Une Âme au ciel, melody for soprano or tenor, music by Durand, 1858
- L'Homme machine vivant et respirant par le sifflet, music by Parizot, 1858
- Mr Grognon !, boutade humoristique, music by Parizot, 1858
- La Musique pour rire. Frontispice lyricocaricatural, music by Durand, 1858
- Plus d'Accidents ! Assurance universelle, music by Vialon, 1858
- Quand les poules auront des dents, music by Clapisson, 1858
- La Servante de Molière !, impressions dramatiques, music by Parizot, 1858
- Tout en Plan ! Plan net de notre planète, music by Parizot, 1858
- Le Toutou de Mylord !, complainte, music by Parizot, 1858
- Le Parrain d'une cloche. Carillon, music by Clapisson, 1859
- Un Chevau-léger du roi ou mon portrait d'autrefois, music by Parizot, 1859
- Le Crime de Lustucru !, cause célèbre, music by Parizot, 1859
- Heureux en Femmes !, ditty, music by Henrion, 1859
- Sur les bords de l'Ohio, chanson nègre, music by Parizot, 1859
- Ah ! Si, j'étais l' Amour !, music by Paul Henrion, 1860
- Le Biberon musical !, harmoni-pompe à jet continu, music by Antoine Vialon, 1860
- Le Docteur Moriko !, music by Robillard, 1860
- Philémon et Baucis !, humorous scene, music by Robillard, 1860
- Le Portrait de la grand'mère, music by Antoine-Louis Malliot, 1860
- Sœur Anne !, fantasy, music by Henrion, 1860
- Le Bas de Madeleine, romancette, music by Étienne Arnaud, 1861
- Ce que c'est que d'avoir un Nez !, ditty, music by Parizot, 1861
- Le Chemin de l'enfant, melody, music by Durand, 1861
- Coquelicot-ci coquelicot là, historiette, music by Émile Ettling, 1861
- Eh ! Dam ! L'on est ben Aise !, music by Robillard, 1861
- Madame Flafla ! Photographie d'une poupée, music by Parizot, 1861
- Madame Plumet et sa demoiselle !, humorous scene, music by Robillard, 1861
- Les Malheurs d'un hanneton !, bourdonnement musical, music by Parizot, 1861
- Les Mémoires d' une bergère !, confidence, music by Parizot, 1861
- Le Nid du berger !, music by Robillard, 1861
- L'Ognon de ma tante !, humorous scene, music by Parizot, 1861
- Le petit Chinois Joli ! Impressions de voyage, music by Parizot, 1861
- La Petite aux yeux bleus !, melody, music by Parizot, 1861
- V'la' c'que c'est qu' d'avoir des Yeux !, ditty, music by Parizot, 1861
- Les cent Amoureux de Suzon !, ditty, music by Olivier, 1862
- Charmaillou au cirque !, humoirous scene from Auvergne, music by Victor Robillard, 1862
- Le Dessus du panier !, ditty, music by Olivier, 1862
- Madame Batifol en Suisse, humorous scene, music by Ettling, 1862
- Le Marchand de parapluies !, ditty, music by Olivier, 1862
- Mes Yeux de 15 ans !, ditty, music by Robillard, 1862
- Mme Fontaine et Mr Robinet !, duet for a lonely man, music by Olivier, 1862
- Ordonnance, concernant les chiens (Protestation à 4 pattes), music by Olivier, 1862
- Le p'tit Marquis de la Gobinette, ou : Je n'en suis pas plus sur pour ça !, music by Robillard, 1862
- Quand on a tout perdu ! Consolations aux affligés, music by Robillard, 1862
- Quatre Hommes et un caporal ! Histoire d'une patrouille, music by Olivier, 1862
- La Romance du bœuf gras !, music by Olivier, 1862
- Saint Pierre ou les chefs du Paradis !, légende évangélique for barytone or bass, music by Olivier, 1862
- Le Valet de cœur !, humorous ditty, music by Moniot, 1862
- L'Amoureuse du régiment !, ditty, music by Olivier, 1863
- Un Baiser à la dame !, souvenirs, music by Victor Parizot, 1863
- Coco et la grise !, ditty, music by Robillard, 1863
- L'École buissonnière !, ditty, music by Olivier, 1863
- Le Fantassin malade ou les lieux qui m'ont vu naître !, exposé des besoins de la vie militaire, music by Olivier, 1863
- Les Gars normands !, ronde normande, music by Olivier, 1863
- Une Mouche sur le nez !, humorous ditty, music by Eugène Moniot, 1863
- La Princesse Finette !, ditty, music by Robillard, 1863
- Quand on a de Ça, ditty, music by Ettling, 1863
- Tic et couic ou la Noce de l'épicier !, balançoire, music by Olivier, 1863
- Le Vin tendre !, song, music by Olivier, 1863
- L'Anglais à marier !, humorous spoken song, music by Olivier, 1864
- La Chandelle !, scie, music by Olivier, 1864
- Comme y t' fait, fais-li !, proverbe, music by Olivier, 1864
- Adieu la Marguerite !, for mezzo-soprano, music by Louis Diémer, 1865
- Ça n'engage à rien !, ditty, music by August Olivier, 1865
- Aïe donc, mon Bidet !, ditty, music by Auguste Olivier, 1866
- Je ne sais plus, ce que je veux dire !, ditty, music by Olivier, 1866
- La Moutarde, ditty, music by Olivier, 1866
- L'Objet aimé !, première passion, music by Olivier, 1866
- Le Sergent bel œillet !, military ditty, music by Olivier, 1866
- Bonsoir, ma Biche !, ditty, music by Olivier, 1867
- Du Monde à dîner !, ditty, music by Olivier, 1867
- J'aime les cocottes, humorous ditty, music by Ettling, 1867
- Voilà l'Plaisir, Mesdames !, music by Lhuillier, 1868
- Les Amours en garnison !, ditty, music by Victor Robillard, 1872
- Le Sabot cassé !, ditty, set in music in 1907 by F. Bonoldi
- La Bavarde, ditty, undated
