= Agathe-Pauline Caylac de Caylan =

French writer (1782–1847)

Agathe-Pauline Caylac de Caylan, Comtesse de Bradi
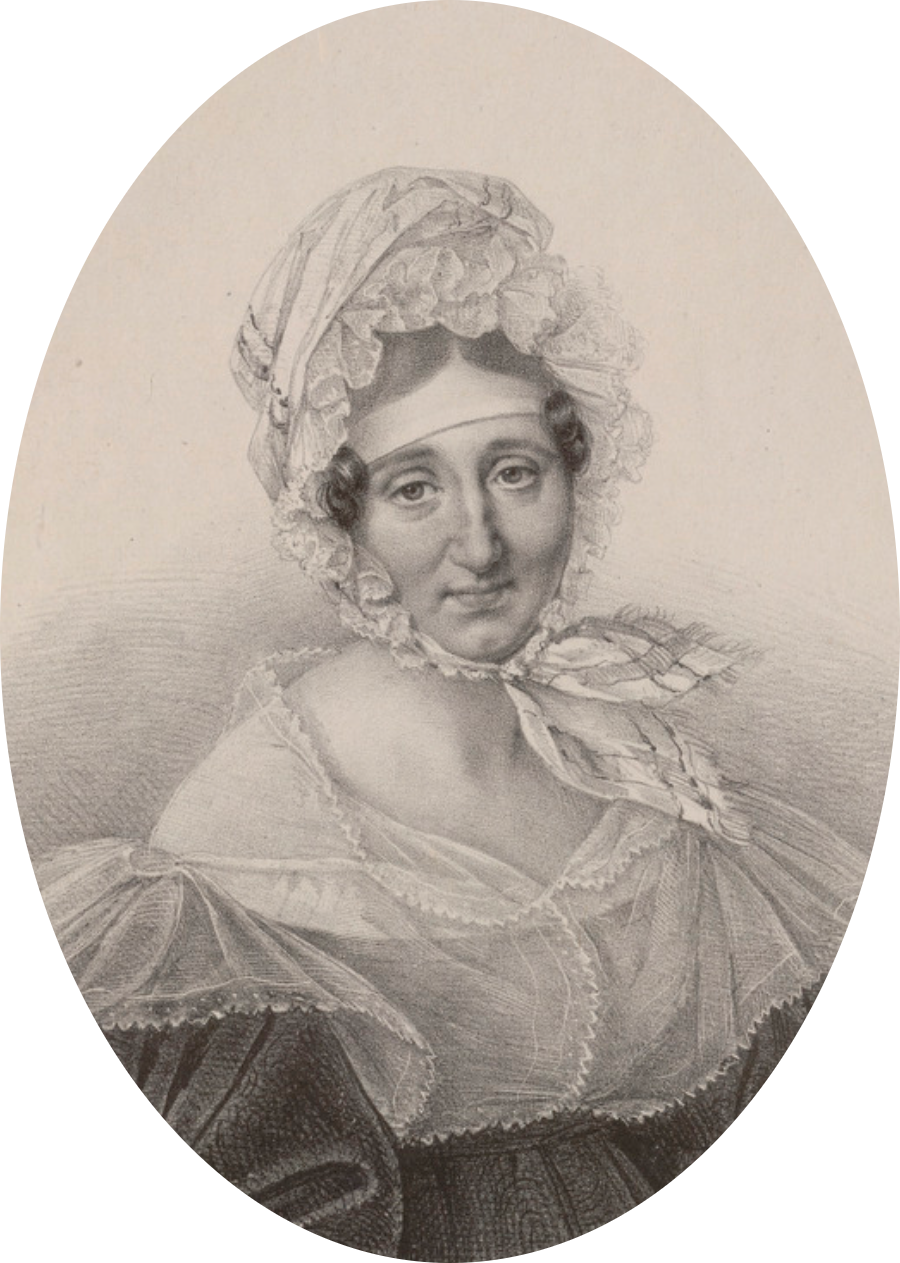
- Born: 1 May 1782 Paris, France
- Died: 7 May 1847 (aged 65) Paris, France
- Children: 3, including Marie de L'Épinay

Agathe-Pauline Caylac de Caylan, Comtesse de Bradi (1 May 1782 – 7 May 1847) was a French writer who contributed to periodicals, produced historical studies of Corsica and wrote books for young people.

== Biography ==
Caylac de Ceylan was born on 1 May 1782 in Paris, France. Her father Guillaume Caylac de Ceylan was a Knight of Saint-Louis and cavalry captain of Basque origin. Her mother was Bonne-Mille-Claude Caylac de Ceylan (née de Newer) from Sweden.

Caylac de Ceylan married a Corsican nobleman at the age of 17. She followed her husband to Italy and he was wounded by shrapnel at the Siege of Genoa and nearly died of starvation. After becoming a mother to three children, Caylac de Ceylan returned to France, settling at the Château de Rebrechien, near Orléans.

Caylac de Ceylan published books on the history of Corsica, which was frowned upon after the fall of Napoleon. In 1826, she published a politico-religious refutation of the opinions of political writer François Dominique de Reynaud, Comte de Montlosier, which was favourably received by the Vatican City but lead to her being called a madwoman, fool and Jesuit by Liberals.

Caylac de Ceylan was a contributor to the fashion magazine, Journal des dames et des modes from 1818, writing on conduct and etiquette. She also wrote books for young people, including the short fiction work La fille spectre (1833), which was translated into English as The Little Dead Woman (1836).

Joseph Duplessy wrote of Caylac de Ceylan that "everything that comes from her pen is distinguished by the nobility of its ideas, the elevation of its sentiments, and the grace of its style."

In addition to writing, Caylac de Ceylan held an aristocratic literary salon. She was befriended by the novelist and writer on education Stéphanie Félicité, comtesse de Genlis.

Caylac de Ceylan died on 7 May 1847 in Paris, France, aged 65. Her daughter Marie de L'Épinay also became a writer.
