= Henry Vannoy =

French actor and playwright

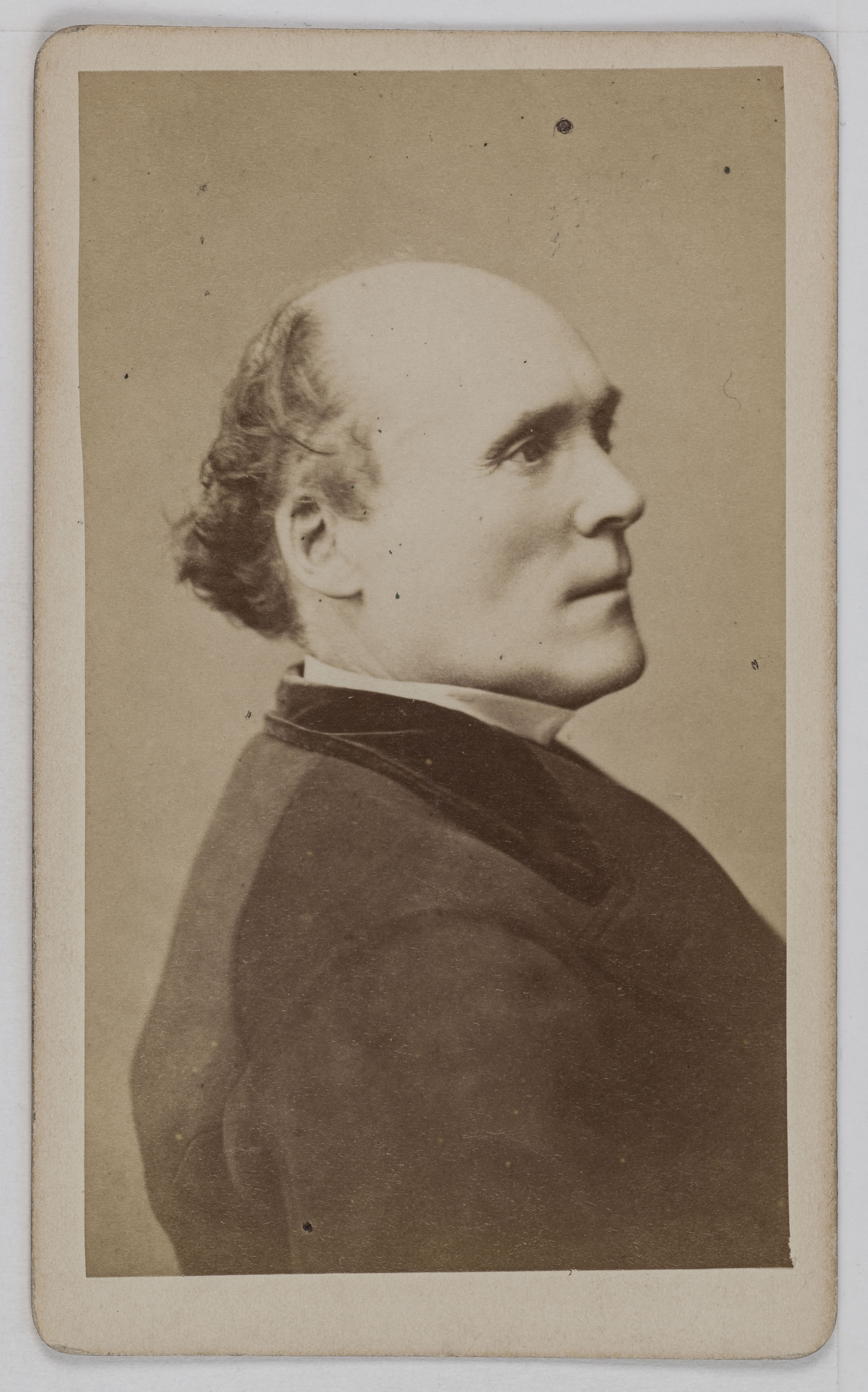
Image of Henry Vannoy

Henry Vannoy, real name Alexandre Henri Alanic (c. 1819 – Paris, 1 November 1889), was a 19th-century French male actor and playwright.

A male actor at the Théâtre de l'Odéon where he distinguished himself in the role of Cocardasse in Le Bossu, from 1850 he became one of the main comedians of the Théâtre de la Porte-Saint-Martin. He also contributed to the writing of some boulevard plays.

== Works ==
- 1851: Le Colporteur, comédie-vaudeville in 2 acts, with Amédée de Jallais,
- 1875: La Vie de Trombalgo,
- 1875: À Sa Majesté la reine Isabelle, Les Deux cousins

== Bibliography ==
- Henry Lyonnet, Dictionnaire des comédiens français (ceux d'hier), 1910
- Georges d'Heylli, Dictionnaire des pseudonymes, 1977, (p. 447)
- Michael Peschke, Encyclopédie Internationale des Pseudonymes, 2006, (p. 34)
