= Eugène Hugot =

French playwright and chansonnier (1819–1904)

Jean Pierre Eugène Hugot (pronounced [øʒɛn yɡo]; 22 December 1819, Nîmes – 25 February 1904, Paris) was a 19th-century French playwright and chansonnier.

His plays were presented on the most important Parisian stages of the 19th-century, including the Théâtre du Palais-Royal, the Théâtre du Vaudeville, and the Théâtre des Folies-Dramatiques.

== Works ==
- 1851: Une femme par intérim, one-act comédie en vaudeville, with Ernest Lehmann
- 1853: Les Fils Gavet, one-act comédie en vaudeville, with Lehmann
- 1855: Histoire d'un châle, comédie en vaudeville in 2 acts, with Armand Chaulieu
- 1856: La Montre de Musette, drama-vaudeville in 3 acts, with Chaulieu
- 1858: Sous le paillasson, comédie en vaudeville in 1 act, with Paul Boisselot
- 1858: Trois nourrissons en carnaval, folie-vaudeville in 3 acts, with Boisselot
- 1859: Le Carnaval des blanchisseuses, comédie en vaudeville in 4 acts, with Boisselot
- 1860: Matelot et fantassin, comédie en vaudeville in 1 act
- 1861: Les Piliers de café, drama-vaudeville in 4 acts, with Abraham and Charles Potier
- 1862: Le Carnaval des gueux, folie-vaudeville in 3 acts and 5 tableaux, with Émile Abraham
- 1865: La Jeunesse de Piron, one-act comedy
- 1868: Les Affaires avant tout, one-act comédie-proverbe
- 1869: La Tarentule, operetta in 1 act, music by Ernest Létang
- 1870: Vinciguerra le bandit, opérette bouffe in 1 act, with Paul Renard, music by Giovanni Bottesini
- 1872: Pygmalion, étude réaliste, d'après l'antique, in 1 little acte and in verse
- 1874: Hue, mon Âne !, scène campagnarde
- 1875: Pygmalion, opérette bouffe en 1 act
- 1883: Élevé au biberon, comedy in 1 act
- 1883: Maître Jules, monologue
- 1883: Maman !..., comédie en vaudeville in 1 act, with Léon Benoît
- 1886: Histoire littéraire, critique et anecdotique du théâtre du Palais-royal, 1784-1884, 2 vol, P. Ollendorff
- 1886: Un fétiche, comedy in 1 act
- 1889: Ah ! non, bourguignon, dittie, music by Paul Bourgès
- 1889: Un duel en chambre, scènes de la vie parisienne, in 1 act
- 1890: Le Diable au couvent, folie-vaudeville in 1 act
- 1891: Une Nuit au poste, fantaisie réaliste in 1 act
- 1893: Madame Nicolet, operetta in 4 acts, music by Alfred Fock.
