= Henry de Kock =

French playwright, novelist, and chansonnier (1819–1892)

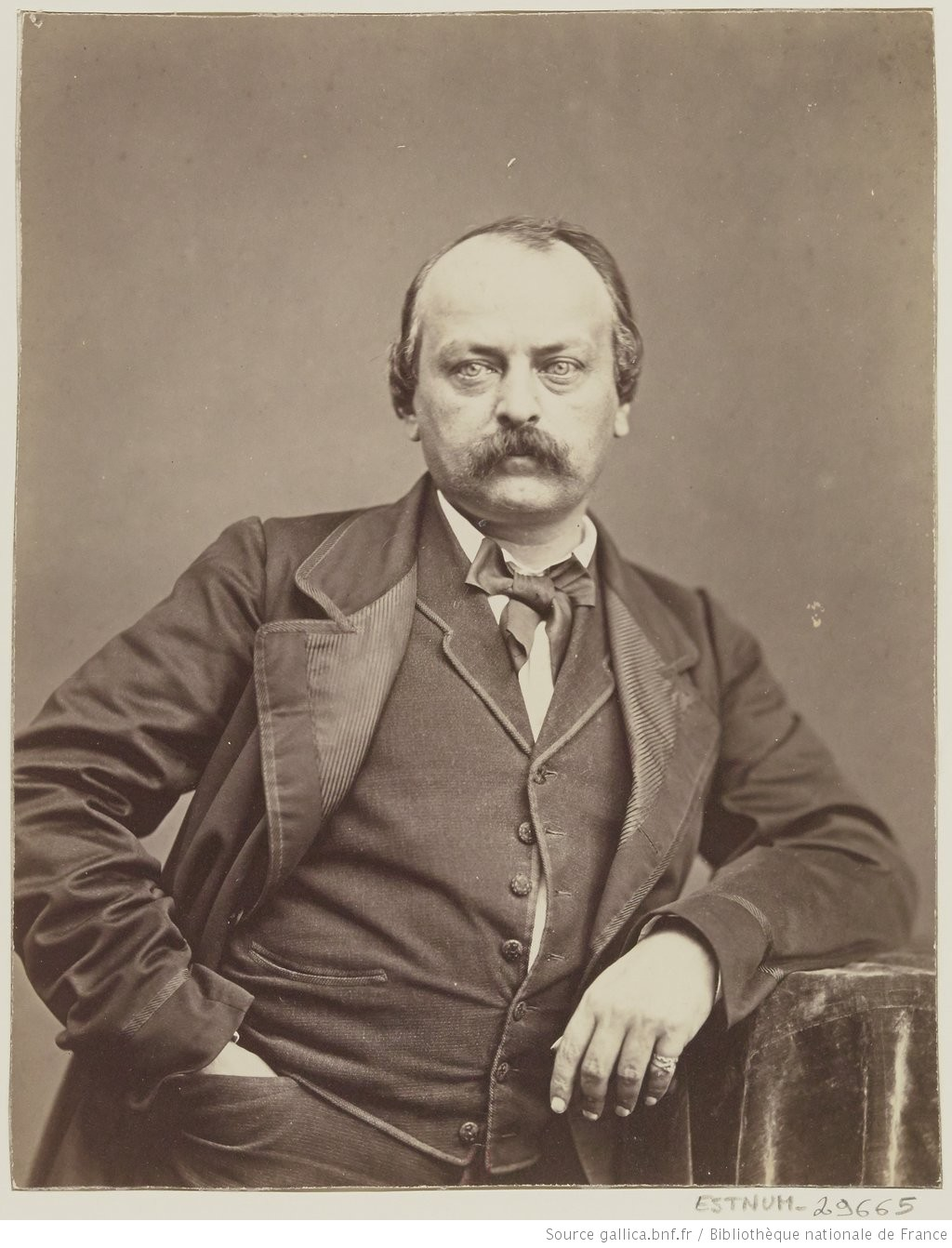
- Henry de Kock
- Born: Paul Henry de Kock; 25 April 1819; Paris, France
- Died: 14 April 1892 (aged 72); Limeil, Paris, France
- Occupations: Novelist playwright chansonnier

Paul Henry de Kock, better known as Henry de Kock, (25 April 1819 – 14 April 1892) was a 19th-century French playwright, novelist, and chansonnier, famous for his salacious novels.

== Biography ==
The son of Paul de Kock, he wrote feuilletons which gained a significant success such as La Voleuse d’amour (1863), L’Auberge des treize pendus (1866), Folies de jeunesse (1866), Ni fille, ni femme, ni veuve (1867), La Fille de son père (1869), Mademoiselle ma femme (1868) or Les Douze travaux d’Ursule (1885).

His Histoire des célèbres courtisanes, his most famous work, translated into four languages, had nine editions from 1869 to 2008.

His plays were presented on the most significant Parisian stages of the 19th-century, including the Théâtre de l'Ambigu-Comique, the Théâtre du Vaudeville, and the Théâtre Beaumarchais.

== Works ==
Novels

- Berthe, l'amoureuse, G. Roux et O. Cassanet, 1843
- La reine des grisettes, G. Roux et Cassanet, 1844
- Le Bon Dieu, pamphlet républicain, 1848
- Brin d'Amour, A. Cadot, 1850
- Minette, 1852
- Les Femmes honnêtes, L. de Potter, 1852
- Deux mères, H. Boisgard, 1853
- Les Petits chiens de ces dames, A. de Vresse, 1856
- La tribu des gêneurs, A. Cadot, 1857
- Les Femmes de la Bourse, A. Cadot, 1858
- Les Mystères du village, A. Cadot, 1858
- Les Femmes honnêtes, A. Cadot, 1860
- La Fille à son père, F. Sartorius, 1860
- Les Amants de ma maîtresse, 1860
- Les Baisers maudits, F. Sartorius, 1861
- La Haine d'une femme, 1861
- Le Démon de l'alcôve, F. Sartorius, 1862
- La Dame aux émeraudes, A. Cadot, 1862
- Les Démons de la mer (la Fiancée du corsaire), 1862
- La Voleuse d'amour, A. Faure, 1863
- L'Amour bossu, E. Dentu, 1863
- Je t'aime !, F. Sartorius, 1863
- Je me tuerai demain, F. Sartorius, 1863
- La Voleuse d’amour, 1863
- Les Buveurs d'absinthe, 1863
- Les mémoires d'un cabotin, 1864
- Ninie Guignon, F. Sartorius, 1864
- La Chute d'un petit, F. Sartorius, 1864
- La Nouvelle Manon, A. Faure, 1864
- Contes pour tous : Les Pantoufles d'acier : Les Trois talismans, F. Sartorius, 1864
- Les Accapareuses, A. Faure, 1864
- La Reine des grisettes, A. de Vresse, 1864
- Le Roi des étudiants, A. de Vresse, 1864
- Les Petites chattes de ces messieurs, A. Faure, 1864
- Le Roman d'un jocrisse, F. Sartorius, 1864
- Les Treize nuits de Jane : Confessions d'une jolie femme, A. Cadot, 1864
- Les Hommes volants : Histoire extraordinaire, A. Cadot, 1864
- Les Mémoires d'un cabotin, A. Faure, 1864
- La Tigresse, A. Cadot, 1864
- Le Roman d'une femme pâle, A. Faure, 1865
- La Fée aux amourettes, F. Sartorius, 1865
- Le Guide de l'amoureux à Paris d'après le manuscrit original de Mme la Baronne de C***, A. Faure, 1865
- Les Trois luronnes, 1865
- Berthe l'Amoureuse, 1865
- La Vie au hasard, F. Sartorius, 1866
- Ma petite cousine, F. Sartorius, 1866
- L’Auberge des treize pendus, 1866
- Folies de jeunesse : Amours et amourettes, A. Cadot, 1866
- Comment aimait une grisette, A. Cadot et Degorce, 1867
- Ni fille, ni femme, ni veuve, F. Sartorius, 1867
- Beau filou : histoire d'un aimable voleur, A. Lacroix Verboeckhoven et Cie, 1867
- Le Marchand de curiosités, A. Faure, 1867
- Le Crime d'Horace Lignon, F. Sartorius, 1868
- La Chute d'un petit, 1868
- La Fille de son père, 1869
- Le roman d'une femme pâle, A. de Vresse, 1869
- Histoire des courtisanes célèbres, 1869
- Mademoiselle ma femme, G. Paetz, 1869
- Morte et vivante, Degorce-Cadot, 1870
- Mademoiselle Croquemitaine, F. Sartorius, 1871
- Histoire des cocus célèbres, Bunel, 1871
- Souvenirs et notes intimes de Napoléon III à Wilhelmshoehe, Librairie internationale, 1871
- Histoire des libertins et libertines célèbres, 1871
- La Fille d'un de ces messieurs : Petits mystères du siège de Paris, E. Dentu, 1872
- La Grande empoisonneuse, 1872
- L'Art d'être heureux en ménage, A. Fayard, 1876
- Le Futur de ma cousine : Histoire bourgeoise, E. Dentu, 1876
- Le Guide de l'amoureux à Paris, 1877
- L'Amoureuse de son mari, A. Sagnier, 1878
- Le Monde où l'on rit jaune, A. Degorce-Cadot, 1882
- Ratée : Histoire d'hier, C. Marpon et E. Flammarion, 1884
- Les Douze travaux d'Ursule, L. Boulanger, 1885
- Le Château du bonheur : histoire bourgeoise, E. Dentu, 1891

Theatre

- 1846: L'Eau et le feu, one-act vaudeville
- 1849: La Danse des écus, one-act folie-vaudeville, with Marc Fournier
- 1850: Qui se dispute, s'adore, proverbe in one act, with Charles Potier
- 1850: L'Hôtel de Nantes, one-act vaudeville-carroussel, with Maurice Alhoy
- 1850: Les Rubans d'Ivonne, one-act comedy, with Lambert-Thiboust
- 1853: Le Mauvais gas, drama vaudeville in five acts
- 1854: La Vie en rose, five-act play, mingled with songs, with Théodore Barrière
- 1854: Le paradis perdu, five-act drama, mingled with songs, with Léon Beauvallet
- 1855: L'Histoire de Paris, 3 acts and 14 tableaux, with Barrière
- 1855: Les Grands siècles, play in three acts and 16 tableaux, with Barrière
- 1857: Le Panier de pêches, one-act comédie en vaudevilles, with Philibert Audebrand
- 1857: Après la pluie, one-act comédie-vaudeville
- 1859: Madame Croquemitaine, ou les Souterrains de la Roche-Noire, three-act vaudeville, with Charles Cabot
- 1860: La Maison du Pont Notre-Dame, drama in five and six tableaux, with Barrière
- 1860: Les trois amours de Tibulle, five-act comedy, in verse, with Barrière
- 1862: Le Minotaure, one-act vaudeville
- 1865: Le Fils aux deux mères, five-act drama including one prologue
- 1867: La Fée aux amourettes, five-act comédie en vaudevilles, with Adolphe Guénée
- undated: Il n'y a plus d'enfants, nightmare in 3 acts and 9 tableaux, with Ernest Blum
- undated: Vade au cabaret, saynète mingled with songs

Songs

- 1844: Mizely !, romance, lyrics and music
- 1863: Ninette, polka for piano
- undated: Chant alsacien !, romance, lyrics and music
- 1865: La Fée aux amourettes !, song, lyrics and music
- undated: Gurth le matelot !, chant du soir, lyrics and music
- 1865: Jeanne qui pleure !, ditty, lyrics and music
- undated: Ma petite Marie !, romance, lyrics and music
- 1869: Minette !, rédowa for piano

== Bibliography ==
- Camille Dreyfus, André Berthelot, La Grande encyclopédie, vol.21, 1886, (p. 584)
- Appletons' Annual Cyclopaedia and Register of Important Events, vol.17, 1893, (p. 590)
- Donald McCormick, Erotic literature: a connoisseur's guide, 1992, (p. 163)
- Yves Olivier-Martin, Histoire du roman populaire en France de 1840 à 1980, 2013, (p. 99-100)
