= Alfred Desroziers =

French playwright (1807–1870)

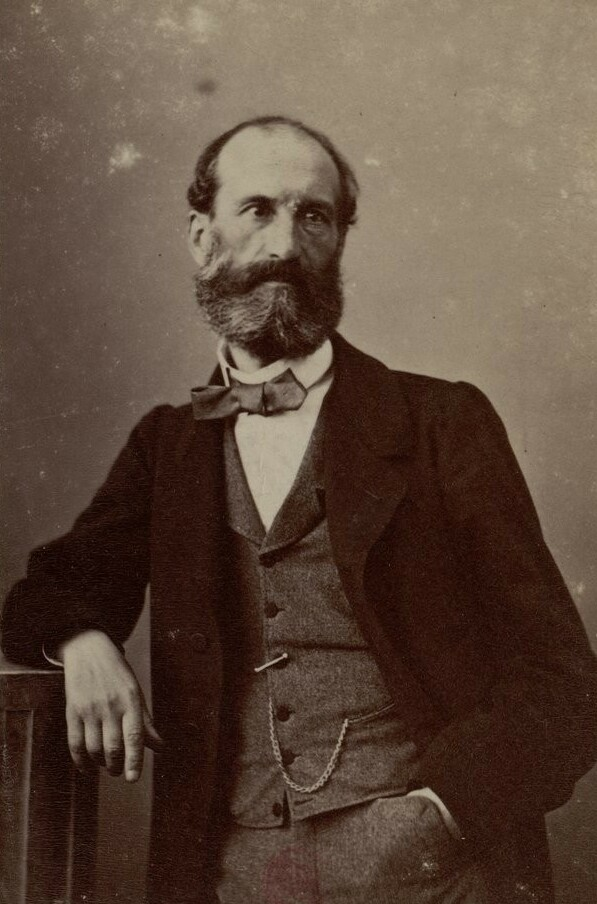
- Born: André Jules Alfred Desroziers; 26 January 1807; Paris, France
- Died: 9 March 1870 (aged 63); Paris, France
- Occupations: Playwright, poet, librettist
- Years active: 1833–1869

Alfred Desroziers, full name André Jules Alfred Desroziers, (26 January 1807 – 9 March 1870) was a French poet, playwright, and librettist

His plays were presented on the several Parisian stages of the 19th century, including the Théâtre de la Gaîté, the Théâtre des Bouffes-Parisiens, the Théâtre du Vaudeville, and the Théâtre du Palais-Royal.

He also wrote under the pen name Deléris and Alfred de Léris (from his mother's name).

== Works ==
- 1833: Trois nouvelles et un conte
- 1840: Zizine, ou l'École de déclamation, vaudeville in 1 act
- 1840: Les Oiseaux de Bocace ["sic"], vaudeville in 1 act, with Saint-Yves
- 1840: L'Autre ou les Deux maris, vaudeville in 1 act, with Saint-Yves
- 1840: Un mariage russe, comédie en vaudevilles in 2 acts, with Félix Dutertre de Véteuil
- 1840: Misère et génie, drama in 1 act, with Henri de Tully
- 1841: La mère et l'enfant se portent bien, comédie en vaudevilles in 1 act, with Dumanoir and Henri de Tully
- 1842: Les Quatre quartiers de la lune, drama-vaudeville in 4 acts
- 1843: L'Amour à l'aveuglette, vaudeville in 1 act, with Édouard Louis Alexandre Brisebarre
- 1843: Un miracle de l'amour, comédie en vaudevilles in 1 act, with Eugène Devaux
- 1844: Les Caravanes d'Ulysse, vaudeville in 2 acts
- 1844: Les Jolies Filles du Maroc, play in 3 acts, mingled with couplets, with Louis Couailhac and Adolphe Guénée
- 1844: Lady Henriette, ou le Marché aux servantes, drama-vaudeville in 5 acts
- 1844: Le Ménage de Rigolette, interior tableau mingled with songs, in 1 act, with Brisebarre
- 1844: La Tête de singe, vaudeville in 2 acts, with Dumanoir and Saint-Yves
- 1845: Les Viveurs, drama in 6 acts mingled with songs, with Clairville
- 1846: Le Châle bleu, comedy in 2 acts, mingled with couplets, with Brisebarre
- 1846: L'Oiseau de paradis, féerie play in 3 acts and 14 tableaux, with Louis Couailhac and Guénée
- 1846: Le Baron de Castel-Sarrazin, comédie en vaudevilles in 1 act, with Clairville and Saint-Yves
- 1848: Le Gentilhomme campagnard, vaudeville in 1 act, with Brisebarre
- 1848: Les 20 sous de Périnette, vaudeville in 1 act, with Brisebarre
- 1850: Portes et Placards, comédie en vaudevilles in 1 act, with Charles Varin
- 1851: Royal-tambour, comédie-vaudeville en 1 act, with Brisebarre
- 1852: Un drôle de pistolet, comédie en vaudevilles in 2 acts, with Varin
- 1852: L'Habit de Mylord, opéra comique in 1 act, with Thomas Sauvage
- 1852: La Jolie Meunière, vaudeville in 1 act
- 1852: Poste restante, vaudeville in 1 act, with Louis Couailhac
- 1853: Les Moutons de Panurge, grande lanterne magique in 3 acts and 12 tableaux including 1 prologue
- 1855: Mes vieux amis, poetry
- 1855: Le Pâté de canard, vaudeville in 1 act, with Dutertre
- 1856: L'Orgue de Barbarie, operetta bouffa in 1 act
- 1857: Au clair de la lune, operetta in 1 act
- 1857: Le Pot de fer et le Pot de terre, vaudeville in 1 act, with Antonin d'Avrecourt and Ernest-Georges Petitjean
- 1858: Simone, opérette en 1 act
- 1860: Les Profits du jaloux, comedy in 1 act
- 1862: Les Deux dots, comédie en vaudevilles in 1 act, with Armand-Numa Jautard
- 1867: Le Danseur de corde, opéra-comique en 2 acts, with Brisebarre
- 1868: Les maris sont esclaves, comédy in 3 acts, in prose
- 1869: Pourquoi l'on aime, comédy in 1 act

== Bibliography ==
- Edmond Antoine Poinsot, Dictionnaire des pseudonymes, 1869, "Desroziers (Alfred)", p. 36.
- Pierre Larousse, Grand dictionnaire universel du XIXe siècle, "Léris (André-Jules-Alfred Desroziers, connu sous le nom de De)", vol. 10 (1873), p. 395.
