= Xavier Eyma =

French journalist and writer (1816–1876)

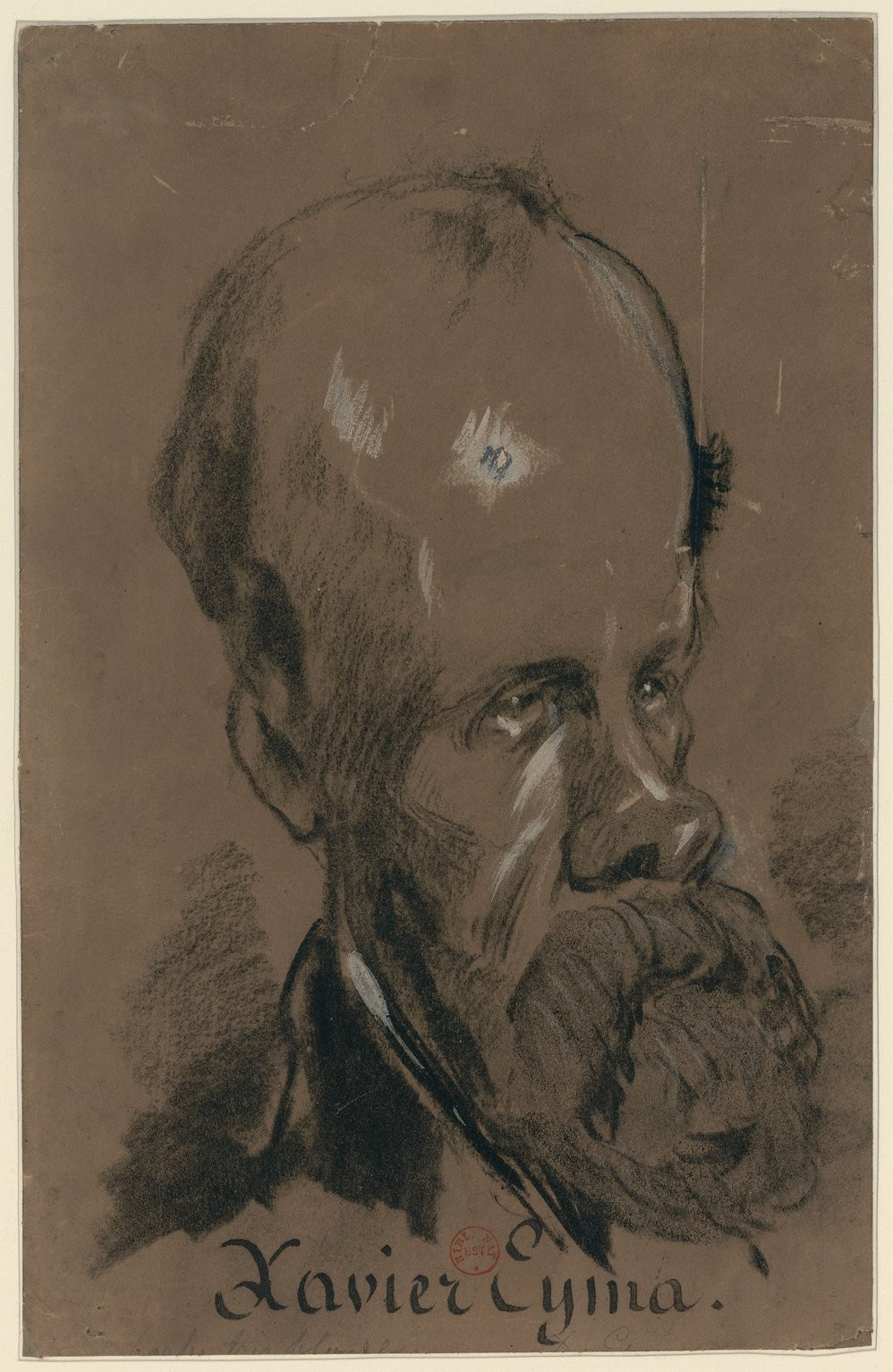
- Xavier Eyma caricatured by Nadar
- Born: Louis-Xavier Eyma; 16 October 1816; Saint-Pierre, Martinique
- Died: 20 March 1876 (aged 59); Paris, France
- Occupations: Journalist; Writer; Playwright

Louis-Xavier Eyma (16 October 1816 – 20 March 1876) was a 19th-century French journalist and writer, author, among others, of novels, travel books and theater plays.

== Biography ==
Born in Martinique, an illegitimate son of Louis, a French lawyer who had long worked in New Orleans and Victorine Eyma, Xavier Eyma studied in France and joined the Navy administration in Paris in 1836. He began to write in the Parisian press and in 1840 obtained a first success with his novel Le Médaillon.

Charged with a mission to West Indies in order to study education there (1845), he also traveled to the United States (1846) as French correspondent of the newspaper La Chronique , which inspired him several travel stories. An editor at the Journal des actionnaires when he was back in France, he returned in 1858 to New-Orleans where his father lived, and worked there as director of the French section of L'Abeille (1858–1859). Among several American personalities, he engaged into a friendship with Washington Irving and visited the plains of Ohio, Mammoth Cave, Leavenworth and Philadelphia.

In New Orleans, he attended the arrival of the rest of the tribe of Seminole on their way to deportation in Arkansas. Although an admirer of the United States, Eyma condemned slavery and the massacre of Indians in his writings.

He then visited Cuba and after he returned to France in 1861, he worked for many newspapers including Le Figaro and La Liberté.

His plays were presented on the most important Parisian stages of the 19th century including Théâtre du Vaudeville, Théâtre des Variétés, and Théâtre de la Porte-Saint-Martin.

Director of Nouvelliste de Paris (1874–1876), he also translated American authors such as Ralph Waldo Emerson (Les lois de la vie 1864, The Conduct of Life) and Washington Irving (Histoire de la conquête de Grenade 1865, Chronicle of the Conquest of Granada).

== Works ==
- 1840: Écrivains et artistes vivants, français et étrangers, biographies, 3 vols.
- 1840: Le Médaillon, novel
- 1841: Emmanuel, poems
- 1842 Introduction à une politique générale
- 1842: L'Abandon !, song
- 1849: Album de 10 mélodies pour voix et piano, with Charles Delange and Francis Tourte
- 1849: Le Croiseur, sea song
- 1849: Dolorita, chanson catalane
- 1850: Capitaine... de quoi ?, one-act comédie en vaudeville, with Amédée de Jallais
- 1851: Le Renard et les raisins, comédie en vaudeville en 1 acte, with de Jallais
- 1852: Les cent écus de Claude, feuilleton
- 1853: Les Deux Amériques, histoire, mœurs et voyages, report
- 1853: Le Mariage au bâton, one-act comédie en vaudeville, with Déaddé Saint-Yves
- 1853: Les Femmes du nouveau monde
- 1854: Les Peaux-Rouges, scènes de la vie des Indiens, report
- 1857: Les Peaux-Noires, scènes de la vie des esclaves, report
- 1860: Excentricités américaines
- 1860: Le Roi des Tropiques
- 1860: Le Trône d'argent
- 1861: Aventuriers et corsaires, Michel Lévy
- 1861: Le Canal maritime du Darien, état de la question
- 1861: La République américaine, ses institutions, ses hommes
- 1862: Le roman de Flavio (Naples en 1798), novel, Michel Lévy
- 1862: Scènes de mœurs et de voyages dans le Nouveau-Monde
- 1862: La vie dans le Nouveau-Monde, récit, Poulet-Malassis
- 1862: Les Trente-quatre étoiles de l'Union américaine
- 1863: Légendes, fantômes et récits du Nouveau-Monde, 2 vols.
- 1863: Les Poches de mon parrain, roman, 2 vols.
- 1864: De la Circulation libre des coupons à revenu fixe
- 1865: Nice et les Alpes-Maritimes, sites pittoresques, monuments, description et histoire des arrondissements de Nice, de Puget-Théniers et de Grasse composant ce nouveau département, texte descriptif et historique, with Joseph Dessaix
- 1866: La Chasse à l'esclave, novel
- 1867: La Mansarde de Rose, followed by Thérèse Lorrain, novel, A. Faure
- 1868: Tobine, bolero
- 1874: 20 Mélodies, piano et chant, with Victor Hugo
- 1874: Les Gamineries de Mme Rivière
- 1876: La Vie aux États-Unis, notes de voyage, Plon
- 1877: Les amoureux de la demoiselle, novel, Dentu
- undated: Les Deux manoirs
- undated: Le Grand cordon et la corde
- undated: Mademoiselle Topaze
- undated: Le Masque blanc
- undated Monrose...

== Bibliography ==
- Jack Corzani, Littérature antillaise (poésie), 1971, p. 80
- Edward Larocque Tinker, Les écrits de langue française en Louisiane au XIXe, 1975, p. 189-190
- Numa Broc, Dictionnaire des Explorateurs français du XIXe siècle, T.3, Amérique, CTHS, 1999, p. 140-141
- Dominique Chancé, Histoire des littératures antillaises, 2005, p. 17
