= Francis Tourte =

French composer, poet and playwright (1816–1891)

- Born: Louis François; 8 June 1816; Paris, France
- Died: 5 October 1891 (aged 75); Paris, France
- Occupations: Composer, chansonnier, poet, playwright

Louis François, better known as Francis Tourte, (8 June 1816 – 5 October 1891) was a 19th-century French composer, poet, chansonnier and playwright. He was François Tourte's grandson.

He wrote lyrics for more than 500 songs and melodies, whose music he sometimes composed, operettas libretti and theatre plays which were presented on the most important Parisian stages of the 19th century including the Théâtre des Délassements-Comiques, the Théâtre des Variétés, and the Théâtre des Bouffes-Parisiens.

== Works ==
=== Poetry ===
- 1841: Brises du matin, poems
- 1843: Rémi ou Croyance et martyre, short story in verse

=== Theatre ===
- 1856: Une femme qui n'y est pas, vaudeville in 1 act
- 1859: Le Docteur Tam-Tam, opérette-bouffe in 1 act, music by Frédéric Barbier
- 1861: La Tour de Bondy, folie musicale in 1 act, music by Deblond
- 1861: Si Pontoise le savait !, comédie-vaudeville in 1 act with Paul-Aimé Chapelle and Jules Adenis
- 1863: Madame Pygmalion, opérette-bouffe in 1 act, with Jules Adenis, music by Frédéric Barbier
- 1867: Un bureau de nourrices, folie musicale in 1 act, music by Georges Douay
- 1867: L'Héritage du postillon, operetta in 1 act, with Amédée de Jallais, music by Auguste L'Eveillé
- 1867: Un cœur d'artiste, comedy in 3 acts mingled with song
- 1868: Mlle Marguerite s. v. p., operetta in 4 acts, with Jules Adenis, music by Théodore Lajarte
- 1872: Le Pommier des amours, operetta in 1 act, music by Georges Douay
- 1873: L'Huissier mélomane, operetta in 1 act, music by Albert Barlatier
- 1873: Le Banquier de ma femme, comedy in 1 act
- 1874: On demande une bonne qui boite, operetta in 1 act, music by Sailly
- 1875: Le Meunier, son fils et... l'autre, opéra comique in 1 act, music by Émile Ettling
- 1875: Les Valets modèles, operetta in 1 act, music by Georges Douay
- 1876: La Chasse aux rivaux, operetta in 1 act, music by Jules d'Aoust
- 1888: Le Chapitre des renseignements, comedy in 1 act
- 1897: Un mariage d'autrefois, opéra comique in 1 act, music by Georges Douay, posthumous

=== Melodies ===
- Azzo le condottiere, music by Gustave Roger
- La Chanson du pressoir, lyrics and music
- Comme on s'aime à Falaise, lyrics and music
- Dans la main de Dieu !, lyrics and music
- Dormez, petit cœur, music by Théodore Ritter
- La Face et le revers, lyrics and music
- Grand'père et Petits-Enfants, music by H. Damoreau-Cinti
- Là-bas sous cette étoile, lyrics et music
- Le Mendiant d'Espagne, music by N. Martyns
- La Meunière du châtelain, music by Victor Massé
- La Révolte des noirs, music by Frédéric Barbier
- Le Roi David, music by Frédéric Barbier
- Toinon, music by Frédéric Barbier
- Tout ça c'est à moi, music by Frédéric Barbier
- Le Vin du purgatoire, lyrics and music
- Album de 10 mélodies pour voix et piano, with Charles Delange and Xavier Eyma, 1849
- Bouquet de bruyères, ballades et chansonnettes, music by several composers, 1858
- Romances, chansons et chansonnettes, music by several composers, 1863
- Almanach de la chansonnette, music by Georges Douay, 1875
