= Eudoxie Laurent =

French actress and singer

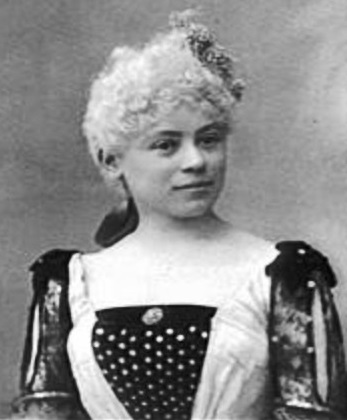
- Eudoxie Laurent in 1872, photograph by Disdéri from La Vie parisienne
- Born: Eudoxie Louise Laurence Yvos; 30 July 1831; La Rochelle
- Died: 15 September 1890 (aged 59); Asnières
- Occupations: Actress, singer
- Spouse: Amédée de Jallais

Eudoxie Laurent, real name Eudoxie Louise Laurence Yvos (30 July 1831 – 15 September 1890) was a 19th-century French actress and singer.

== Biography ==
She appeared in Un oncle aux carottes by Albert Monnier and Édouard Martin on the stage of the théâtre des Variétés (1854) in the part of Nichette then in Les Fils de Charles Quint by Victor Séjour at the théâtre de l'Ambigu-Comique (1864) and in Histoire d'un drapeau by Adolphe d'Ennery (1865).

An actress in the troupe of the théâtre de la Porte-Saint-Martin, she married the playwright Amédée de Jallais in 1862. After she performed at Bobino (1865) and at the Théâtre des Nouveautés (1867), she became a star at the Alcazar d'Été in 1869.

After major roles at the théâtre du Châtelet (La Faridondaine) (1873) and in 1876 at the Théâtre Historique in a revival of La Bergère des Alpes by Marmontel, she was forced to leave the theater because of an illness. Laurent died in 1890.

== Bibliography ==
- Émile Abraham, Les Acteurs et les actrices de Paris, 1858, (p. 98)
- Henry Lyonnet, Dictionnaire des comédiens français, 1911, (p. 310)
