= Armand-Numa Jautard =

French playwright and chansonnier

Armand-Numa Jautard was a 19th-century French playwright and chansonnier who died after 1872.

His plays were performed on the most important Parisian stages of the 19th century: Théâtre des Folies-Dramatiques, Théâtre de l'Odéon, Théâtre du Palais-Royal, Théâtre des Variétés etc.

== Works ==
- 1835: Deux pour un, ou le Bigame, vaudeville in one act
- 1842: La Peur du mal, comedy in 1 act, mingled with couplets, with Albéric Second
- 1844: Les petits mystères du jardin Mabille dévoilés, 3 vols., with Max Revel
- 1844: L'École d'un fat, comedy in one act and in prose, with Marie de L'Épinay
- 1848: Les Fils de Télémaque, vaudeville in 1 act, with Henri de Tully
- 1851: Les Giboulées, vaudeville in 1 act, with Amédée de Jallais
- 1851: Un Monsieur qui n'a pas d'habit, comédie en vaudevilles in 2 acts, with Montjoye
- 1852: Un Mari d'occasion, comedy in one act, with Lucas
- 1852: L'Original et la copie, comedy in 1 act and in verses, with Gustave Harmant, 1852
- 1853: Un Fils malgré lui, foly-vaudeville in two acts, with Armand Montjoye, 1853
- 1854: L'Esprit familier, comédie en vaudevilles in one act, with Hippolyte Lucas, 1854
- 1854: La Fille mousquetaire, anecdote du temps de Louis XIV, in two acts, mingled with songs, with Lucas, 1854
- 1854: Un Roi malgré lui, comédie en vaudevilles in two acts, with Montjoye
- 1858: Rompons !, operetta bouffe in 1 act, with de Jallais
- 1859: La Chanson de Margot, vaudeville in two acts
- 1862: Les Deux dots, comédie en vaudevilles in 1 act, with Alfred Desroziers
- undated: Blanche et Marie, romance

== Bibliography ==
- Pierre Larousse, Grand dictionnaire universel du XIXe siècle, 1866, p. 721
