= Adolphe Guénée =

French playwright (1818–1877)

Louis Adolphe Guénée (14 December 1818 in Paris – 16 July 1877 in Paris) was a 19th-century French playwright.

The son of a conductor of the Théâtre du Palais-Royal, he studied in College Bourbon and made his debut in 1838 at the Théâtre de la Gaîté.

Director of the theater district of Caen, his plays were presented on the most significant Parisian stages of his time including the Théâtre des Folies-Dramatiques, the Théâtre des Délassements-Comiques, and the Théâtre du Palais-Royal.

== Works ==
- L'Orphelin du parvis Notre-Dame ou la Jeunesse de d'Alembert, comédie-vaudeville in 1 act, 1838
- La France et l'industrie, vaudeville allégorique in 1 act, à propos de l'exposition des produits de 1839, with Pierre Tournemine, 1839
- Les Guerres de Paris, vaudeville populaire in 3 acts, with Tournemine, 1839
- Une Mauvaise plaisanterie, vaudeville in 1 act, with Jules Brésil, 1839
- Tiennette ou le racoleur et la jeune fille, vaudeville in 1 act, with Alexandre Ferré, 1839
- L'Inondation de Lyon, épisode des désastres du Midi, in 2 acts and 3 tableaux, 1840
- Le Bijoutier de Nuremberg, ou : Elle me console, drama in 3 acts, with Potier, 1840
- La Femme de l'émigré, drama in 2 acts mingled with songs, with Georges Fath, 1840
- Les Gueux de Paris, épisode de 1625, vaudeville populaire in 3 acts, with Tournemine, 1841
- 1842 à l'hôtel Bullion, revue in 1 act mingled with couplets, with Auguste Jouhaud, 1842
- Les Enfants peints par eux-mêmes, revue-vaudeville in 1 act, with Alexandre Auguste de Berruyer, 1842
- La Fille du ciel; preceded by l'Ile des lutins, prologue in 1 act, with Clairville, 1843
- L'Histoire des écoles, review of seven centuries in 6 acts and 10 parts, with Tournemine, 1843
- Les Jolies filles du Maroc, three-act play, mingled with couplets, with Louis Couailhac and Alfred Desroziers, 1844
- L'Oiseau de paradis, féerie play in 3 acts and 14 tableaux, with Couailhac and Desroziers, 1846
- O'Néa, ou Taïti et Versailles, play in 3 acts mingled with song, with Couailhac, 1847
- Le Président d'Entrecasteaux ou le parlement et les Jésuites, scène historique du XVIIIe siècle (1773-1784), 1847
- La Reine Argot, parodie de La Reine Margot by Alexandre Dumas, in 3 acts, 7 tableaux and in verse, with Marc Leprévost and Lubize, 1847
- 23 et 24 février ou le Réveil du peuple, patriotic picture in 1 act between two barricades, with Leprévost and Jouhaud, 1848
- Un Voyage en Icarie, à-propos in 1 act, mingled with couplets, 1848
- La Graine de mousquetaires, vaudeville in 5 acts, with Paul de Kock, 1849
- Rhum, à propos mêlé de couplets, with Clairville and Leprévost, 1849
- Gâchis et poussière, revue in 3 acts and 12 tableaux, with Delacour, 1850
- Voilà le plaisir, mesdames !, revue in 4 acts and 16 tableaux, with Delacour, 1851
- Le Porte-drapeau d'Austerlitz, drame in 1 act, mingled with song, 1852
- Les Variétés de 1852, revue-féerie in 4 acts and 12 tableaux, followed by the 2999e presentation of la Femme aux camélias, parody in 1 act, with Delacour and Lambert-Thiboust, 1852
- Une Femme qui se grise, vaudeville in 1 act, with Alfred Delacour and Lambert-Thiboust, 1853
- Un Gendre en mi-bémol, folie-vaudeville in 1 act, with Alexandre Flan, 1853
- L'Alma, à propos patriotique mingled with couplets, in 1 tableaux, with Amédée de Jallais, 1854
- La Fille du feu, féerie in 3 acts and 8 tableaux, with Monnier, 1854
- La Queue de la comète, revue of the year 1853, in 3 acts and 4 tableaux, with Eugène Cormon and Eugène Grangé, 1854
- Les Toiles du Nord, parodie de l'Étoile du Nord, in 3 acts and 4 tableaux, preceded by Devant le rideau, prologue, with Monnier and Flan, 1854
- Voilà ce qui vient de paraître, revue of the year 1854, in 3 acts et 16 tableaux, avec Potier, 1854
- La Dame aux trois maris, vaudeville in 1 act, with Potier, 1855
- L'Enfant du petit monde, vaudeville in 3 acts, with Potier, 1855
- Dzing ! Boum ! Boum !, revue de l'Exposition in 3 acts and 16 tableaux, with Potier and Eugène Mathieu, 1855
- La Vivandière des zouaves, monologue-vaudeville in 1 act, 1855
- Allons-y gaiment, revue of the year 1856, in 3 acts and 14 tableaux, with Charles Potier, 1856
- Les Dragées du 16 mars, à-propos mingled with couplets, with Potier, 1856
- Si j'étais riche, comédie vaudeville in 1 act, with Potier, 1856
- Vous allez voir ce que vous allez voir, revue of the year 1855, n 3 acts and 16 tableaux, with Potier, 1856
- Les Délassements à la belle-étoile, prologue d'ouverture in 2 tableaux, with Albert Monnier, 1857
- Le Premier feu, vaudeville in 1 act, with Potier, 1857
- En avant, marche !, revue of the year 1857, in 3 acts and 16 tableaux. La Guerre des saisons, prologue, with Potier, 1857
- Dans une cave, vaudeville in 1 act, with Jules Renard, 1858
- Le Marquis de Carabas, vaudeville in 1 act, with Théodore Faucheur, 1858
- Tout Paris y passera, revue of the 1858, in 3 acts and 14 tableaux, preceded by Paris sur scène, prologue, with Potier, 1858
- L'Aveugle de Bagnolet, drame-vaudeville in 3 acts, with Charles Deslys, 1859
- Huis-clos, comedy in 1 act, with Adolphe Marquet and Charles Lecocq, 1859
- Monsieur Croquemitaine, comedy mingled with song, with Faucheur, 1860
- L'Œuf de Pâques, ou le Billet à ordre, comedy mingled with song, with Faucheur, 1860
- Le 16 décembre, dramatic and lyrical scene performed on the Grand Theatre Ghent on the occasion of the birthday of His Majesty King Leopold I December 14, 1860, with Albert Vizentini, 1860
- La Routine et le progrès, Opening prologue mingled with couplets, 1861
- Tout Rouen y passera, et la Bouille aussi, great fairy-review of Rouen in 5 acts and 24 tables, extravaganza, 1864
- Bobino vit encore, revue in 3 acts and 10 tableaux, 1866
- La Fée aux amourettes, comédie-vaudeville in 5 acts, with de Kock, 1867
- Deucalion et Pyrrha, pastorale mythologique, with Clairville, 1870
- Antoine et Cléopâtre, operetta in 1 act, 1876
- Sébastopol, à propos patriotique, with de Jallais, undated

== Bibliography ==
- Gustave Vapereau, Dictionnaire universel des contemporains, 1861, p. 791
- La Grande encyclopédie, inventaire raisonné des sciences, des lettres et des arts, vol.19, 1886, p. 513
- Le Temps n°5935 18 July 1877 (obituary)
