= Alexandre Ferré =

French playwright

Alexandre Ferré also known as Firmin or Saint-Firmin, (? – 27 February 1839) in Paris was a 19th-century French playwright.

A former sergeant in the National Guard, he became actor and tenor at Versailles. Hired by the Théâtre de la Gaîté then, after a tour in Seine-et-Oise, at the Théâtre de l'Ambigu-Comique, he played the part of Don César de Bazan in Ruy Blas at the inauguration of the Théâtre de la Renaissance 8 November 1838. Sick, he last played 5 January 1839 and died a month later after this success. He was then replaced in that role by Charles de Chilly.

His plays were presented among others at the Théâtre de la Gaîté, the Théâtre de l'Ambigu-Comique and the Théâtre du Panthéon.

== Works ==
- 1833: Cinq-Mars, drama in 5 acts in prose
- 1836: Le Ménage de Titi, tableau in 1 act, mingled with couplets, with Théodore de Lustières
- 1837: Baron le comédien, anecdote-vaudeville in 1 act, with Jean-Baptiste Tuffet
- 1838: Maître Job, ou Ma femme et mon télescope, vaudeville in 1 act
- 1839: Tiennette, ou le Racoleur et la jeune fille, vaudeville in 1 act, with Adolphe Guénée
- 1846: Je vous y prends ! ou l'Assurance mutuelle, vaudeville épisodique in 1 act, posth.

== Bibliography ==
- Joseph Marie Quérard, Les supercheries littéraires dévoilées, 1852, p. 216
