= Charles Cabot =

French playwright, chansonnier and writer

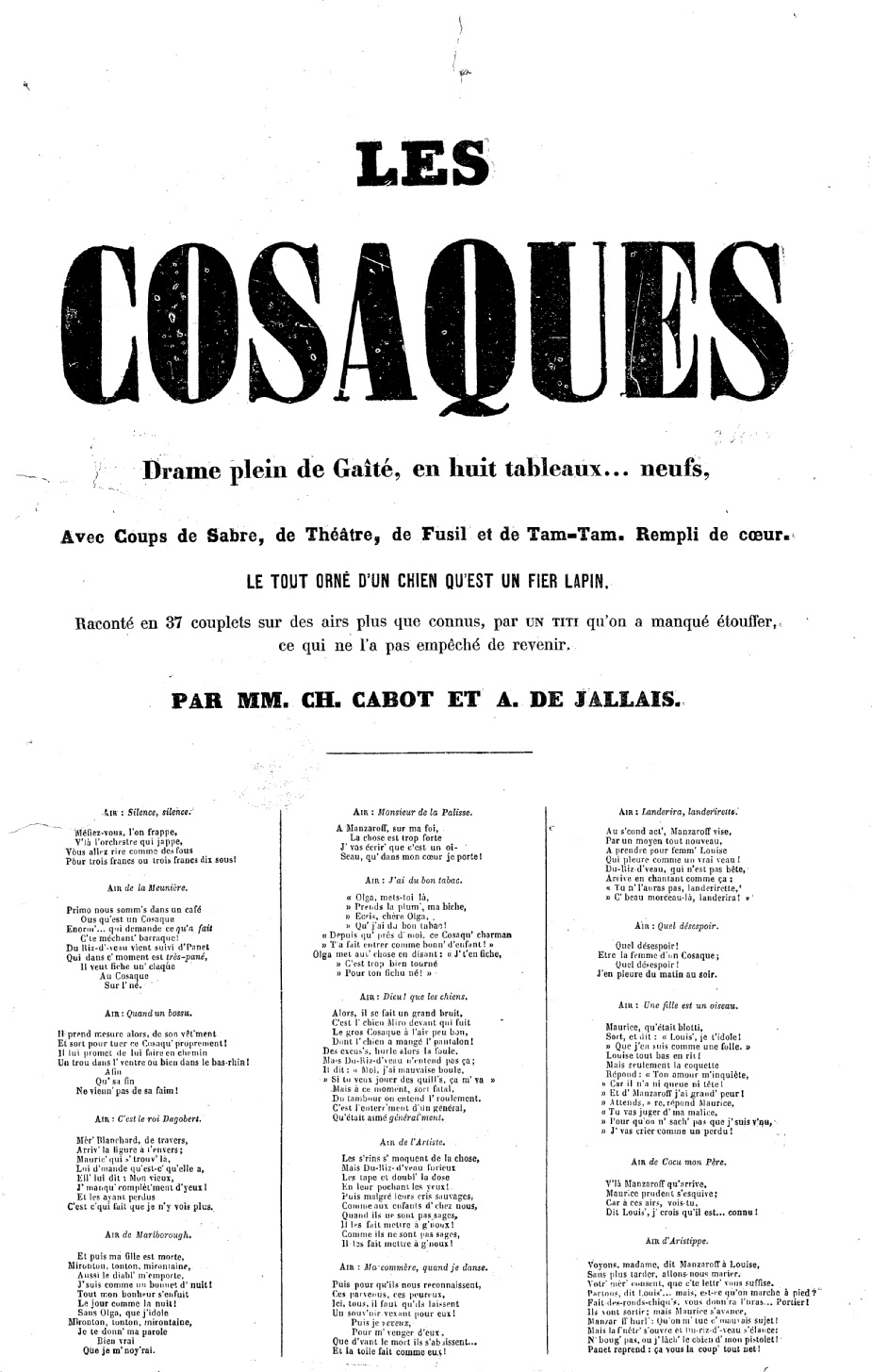
Les Cosaques, drama in 8 tableaux, by Charles Cabot and Amédée de Jallais, 1857 (cover)

Charles Antoine Cabot (French: [ʃaʁl kabo]; 1806 – 11 February 1886) was a 19th-century French playwright, chansonnier and writer.

First an actor at the theatres de la Gaîté, des Nouveautés, de l'Ambigu, du Cirque and de la Porte Saint-Martin (1837–1840), he became dramaturge at the Théâtre historique and the Théâtre de la Gaîté (1847), then general dramaturge at the Théâtre du Châtelet (1863–1874). His plays were presented on the most important Parisian stages of the 19th century.

== Works ==
- Catastrophe épouvantable arrivée au puisatier Giraud et à son compagnon Jala, with Amédée de Jallais, 1854
- La Corde du pendu, two-act comédie en vaudeville, with de Jallais and Édouard Cadol, 1854
- La Mauvaise aventure d'une pauvre parfumeuse, with de Jallais, 1854
- Sous un bec de gaz, scène de la vie nocturne, with de Jallais and Léon Lelarge, 1854
- Nicodème sur la terre, one-act vaudeville, with de Jallais, 1855
- Jacqueline Doucette, one-act vaudeville, with de Jallais, 1855
- Le Médecin sans enfants, ou le don Juan de Vincennes et ce qu'on perd quand on a une paire de pères, parody in 2 tableaux, with de Jallais, 1855
- L'Envoyé de Dieu, 1856
- Mon ami l'habit vert, one-act vaudeville, with Théodore Barrière, 1857
- Roger Bontemps à la représentation de la Fausse adultère, with de Jallais, 1857
- Les Cosaques, drama in 8 tableaux, with de Jallais, 1857
- Une Aventure sous Louis XV, one-act vaudeville, 1858
- Les Deux Barbes, one-act vaudeville, 1858
- Un Monsieur qui a la vue basse, one-act vaudeville, 1858
- Madame Croquemitaine, ou les Souterrains de la Roche-Noire, three-act vaudeville, with Henry de Kock, 1859
- L'histoire d'un drapeau racontée par un zouave, complainte en trop de couplets, with de Jallais, 1860
- Les Chinois au Châtelet, parodie burlesque sur la prise de Pékin, 1862
- Les Aventures de Mandrin, historical and fantastic drama, 1865
- Les Malheurs d'un homme heureux, one-act vaudeville, 1865
- La Béquille du diable boiteux, 1866
- Les Aventures merveilleuses de Gulliver, 1867
- La chambre ardente, histoire de la Marquise de Brinvilliers, la célèbre empoisonneuse, 1868
- La Chatte blanche, 1869
- Les Compagnons de la Marjolaine, 1869
- Patrie ! ou le Passé, le présent et l'avenir, stances en l'honneur du centième anniversaire de Napoléon Ier, et de la fête de S. M. Napoléon III. La Reine des anges, cantate en l'honneur du 15 août, 1869
- Mignonne, one-act comedy, 1871
- La Légende de Cendrillon ou les égarements d'une pantoufle, 1873
- Allez à Saint-Honoré les Bains, 1881
- François les Bras Bleus, three-act opéra comique, 1883
- Chansons et monologues, undated

== Bibliography ==
- Gazette anecdotique, littéraire, artistique et bibliographique, 1886, (p. 91) (obituary)
- Henry Lyonnet, Dictionnaire des comédiens français, 1911
