= Max Revel =

French writer, journalist and playwright

Max Revel (18..? – 18..), pseudonym for Victor-Marie Revellière, was a French writer, journalist and playwright of the 19th century. He also was managing director of the Théâtre historique.

He authored some vaudevilles under the pseudonym "Victor Doucet", and other texts under the pseudonym "Max de Revel". However, he signed almost all his articles and pamphlets under his first pseudonym.

== Works ==
- Les petits mystères du jardin Mabille, by MM. Max Revel [Revelière] and J. [Jautard] Numa, 1844.
- Léonce, ou Propos de jeune homme : comédie en vaudevilles in 3 acts, by MM. Bayard and Victor Doucet, 1838.
- Eugène Pierron
- Le Chevalier Kerkaradeck, comédie en vaudevilles in 1 act, by MM. Roche and Max de Revel... [Paris, Palais-Royal, 5 August 1840.]
- Fechter (vaudeville)
- Laurentine
- La Terreur, histoire des tribunaux révolutionnaires, according to unpublished documents... by MM. Max de Rével and A. de St-Cérand.
- Les théâtres de Paris-Delaunay / [Signed Max de Revel]
- Grassot embêté

== Sources ==
- La littérature française contemporaine / Quérard, Louandre, Bourquelot : Revellière (Victor-Maxime). - Lorenz : Revel (Max) / BN Cat. gén. : Revelière (Victor-Maxime), pseud. Victor Doucet et Max de Revel. - BN Cat. gén. suppl. : Revelière (Victor-Maxime), dit Max Revel / Abebook
