= Édouard Lafargue =

Édouard Edmond Lafargue (1803 in Langon – 1 February 1884 in Paris) was a French playwright.

His plays have been performed on the most important Parisian stages of the 19th century: Théâtre du Palais-Royal, Théâtre du Gymnase dramatique, Théâtre du Vaudeville, Théâtre des Variétés etc. Some of his pieces were signed under the pen name Camille

== Plays ==
- 1825 : Le mauvais sujet, drama, with Eugène Scribe
- 1842 : Le Château de la Roche-noire, ou Un amour posthume, comedy in 1 act, mixed with vaudevilles, with Paul Siraudin
- 1845 : L'almanach des 25,000 adresses, comédie en vaudevilles in three acts, with Ferdinand de Villeneuve
- 1845 : L'Escadron volant de la Reine, comédie en vaudevilles in 1 act, with Dumanoir
- 1847 : La Cour de Biberach, comédie en vaudevilles in 1 act, with Eugène Guinot
- 1850 : Un fantôme, comédie en vaudevilles in 1 act, with de Villeneuve
- 1851 : Mme Bertrand et Mlle Raton, comédie en vaudevilles in 1 act, with Dumanoir
- 1852 : Mademoiselle de Navailles, comédie en vaudevilles in 1 act, with Siraudin
- 1853 : Le bourreau des crânes, comédie en vaudevilles in 3 acts, preceded by a prologue, with Paul Siraudin
- 1853 : Un mari charmant, comédie en vaudevilles in 1 act, with Dumanoir
- 1854 : La marquise de Tulipano, comédie en vaudevilles in 2 acts, with Dumanoir
- 1854 : La Mort du pêcheur, comédie en vaudevilles in 1 act, with Siraudin
- 1857 : L'Homme qui a vécu, comédie en vaudevilles in 2 acts, with Dumanoir
- 1858 : La Balançoire, comedy in 1 act, mixed with couplets, with Dumanoir
- 1860 : Le Chapitre de la toilette, comedy in 1 act, with Antonin d'Avrecourt and Ernest-Georges Petitjean
- 1860 : Un tyran en sabots, comedy in 1 act, in prose, with Dumanoir
- 1861 : Le Gentilhomme pauvre, comedy in 2 acts, in prose, with Dumanoir
- 1862 : Le Domestique de ma femme, comédie envaudevilles in 1 act, with d'Avrecourt and Petitjean
- 1862 : Les Invalides du mariage, comedy in 3 acts, with Dumanoir
- 1863 : Trois chapeaux de femme, comédie en vaudevilles in 1 act, with Siraudin

== Bibliography ==
- Joseph Marie Quérard, Félix Bourquelot, Charles Louandre, La littérature française contemporaine. XIXe siècle, 1852, (p. 527)
- Édouard Feret, Personnalités & notables girondins, 1889, (p. 352)
