= Antonin d'Avrecourt =

French playwright

Antonin Ernest d'Avrecourt, also known under the pseudonym Ernest-Georges Petitjean, was a French playwright of the 19th century, mostly known for his comedies and vaudevilles.

His plays, signed under several pseudonyms, were performed on the most important Parisian stages of his time: Théâtre des Variétés, Théâtre du Vaudeville, Théâtre de la Renaissance etc.

== Works ==
- 1831: Fifi Lecoq, ou Une visite domiciliaire, anecdote contemporaine, mêlée de couplets, with Philippe-Amédée Roustan
- 1831: La Future de province, ou les Informations, comédie en vaudevilles in 1 act, with Dumanoir
- 1833: Poète et maçon, comédie en vaudevilles in 1 act, with Adolphe de Leuven and Eugène Roche
- 1833 : Le Cadet de famille, vaudeville in 1 act, with Léon Lévy Brunswick and Louis-Émile Vanderburch
- 1836: Madame Peterhoff, vaudeville anecdote in 1 act, with Charles de Livry
- 1836: Une spéculation, vaudeville in 1 act, with Dumanoir and E. Roche
- 1837: Absent et présent, comedy in 1 act, mixed with distincts
- 1837: L’Épée de mon père, comédie en vaudevilles in 1 act, with Charles Desnoyer
- 1838: Les parens de la fille, comedy in 1 act and in prose, with Félix Arvers and Ernest-Georges Petitjean
- 1841: Les Vieilles amours, vaudeville in 1 act, with F. Arvers and Petitjean
- 1842: Les Ressources de Jonathas, comédie en vaudevilles in 1 act, with Charles Varin
- 1844 : Les anglais en voyage, vaudeville in one act, with F. Arvers
- 1848: La Fiancée du prince, comedie en vaudevilles in 3 acts, with Arsène de Cey and Petitjean
- 1849: Lord Spleen, with Arvers and Petitjean
- 1850: Le Banquet de camarades, with Arvers and Petitjean
- 1854: Monsieur de La Palisse, vaudeville in 1 act, with Pierre Carmouche, Eugène Nyon and Petitjean
- 1857: Le Pot de fer et le pot de terre, vaudeville in 1 act, with Alfred Desroziers and Petitjean
- 1858: Le Chapitre de la toilette, comedy in 1 act, with Édouard Lafargue and Petitjean
- 1862: Le Domestique de ma femme, comédie en vaudeville in 1 act, with Lafargue and Petitjean
- 1862 : Essai sur les institutions romaines sous la République et sous l'Empire
- 1862 : Étude sur la Pléiade et sur son influence
