= Auguste Jouhaud =

Belgian writer

Auguste Jouhaud (6 October 1805, Brussels – 27 January 1888, Paris) was a 19th-century Belgian writer and playwright who authored more than 600 theatre plays.

== Main plays ==
- Un voyage à melun (1842)
- La fauvette : opéra-comique
- Les Hussards de la République
- La folle de Waterloo
- Un mari en location
- L'Amour au village : opérette
- Mes petits mémoires
- Les deux Pierrots
- Catherine 3/6, three-act comédie en vaudeville, parody of La Reine Margot by Alexandre Dumas, with Adolphe Salvat
