= Philibert Audebrand =

French writer and journalist (1815–1906)

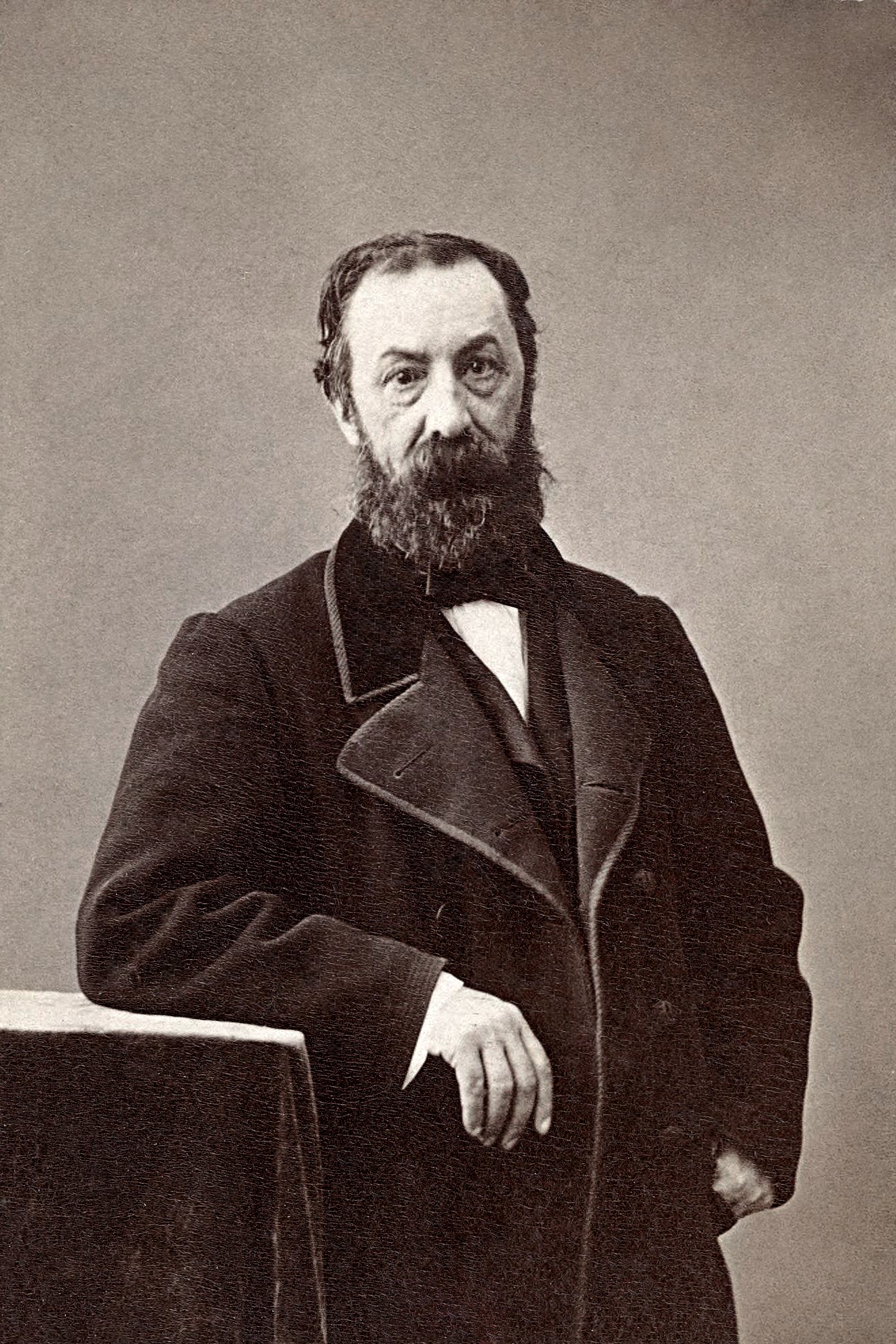
- Philibert Audebrand by Nadar
- Born: 13 December 1815; Saint-Amand-Montrond (Cher)
- Died: 10 September 1906 (aged 90)
- Occupations: Writer; Journalist

Philibert Audebrand (31 December 1815 – 10 September 1906) was a French writer, journalist, author of medieval chronicles, satirical verses and historical novels. In Mémoires d'un passant (Calmann-Lévy, 1893), he dedicated a portrait to Bernard-François Balssa, Honoré de Balzac's father.

He wrote under two pseudonyms: Alpha and Eugène Duvernay.

== Works ==
- Fontainebleau, paysages, légendes, souvenirs, fantaisies
- Michel Chevalier
- Napoléon a-t-il été un homme heureux ?
- A qui sera-t-elle ? histoire de l'autre jour
- Bérengère de Chamblis, histoire d'un château
- Un café de journalistes sous Napoléon III
- César Berthelin, manieur d'argent
- Ceux qui mangent la pomme, racontars parisiens
- Le chevalier noir
- Lauriers et cyprès, pages d'histoire contemporaine
- Leon Gozlan, scènes de la vie littéraire (1828–1865)
- La lettre déchirée
- Les Mariages d'aujourd'hui
- Les mariages manqués
- Les trois nuits de sir Richard Cockerill
- Les violette blanche : conte vrai
- Voyage et aventures autour du monde de Robert Kergorieu
- Les Yeux noirs et les yeux bleus
- Les sacripants de Paris
- Schinderhannes et les bandits du Rhin
- Le Secret de Chamblis, histoire d'un château...
- La Sérénade de don Juan
- Soldats, poètes et tribuns : petits mémoires du XIXe siècle
- Souvenirs de la tribune des journalistes (1848-1852)
- Les Trois Juifs
- Mémoires d'un passant
- La salamandre d'or... [- Le Dernier chapitre]
- Nos Révolutionnaires, pages d'histoire contemporaine, 1830-1880
- Le Chien de la Chataigneraie
- La clé d'argent
- Comment on joue un fin renard, scènes de la vie parisienne
- Derniers jours de la bohème : souvenirs de la vie littéraire
- Les Divorces de Paris, scènes de la vie intime
- La dot volée : scènes de la vie parisienne
- Le Drame de la Sauvagère
- P.-J. Proudhon et l'écuyère de l'Hippodrome, scènes de la vie littéraire
- Le Péché de Son Excellence
- Un petit-fils de Robinson
- Petites Comédies du boudoir
- Petits mémoires d'une stalle d'orchestre : acteurs, actrices, auteurs, journalistes
- Petits mémoires du XIXe siècle
- La Pivardière le bigame
- Romanciers et viveurs du XIXe siècle
- L'Enchanteresse, histoire parisienne
- Une fête sur le feu, scènes de la vie parisienne
- La Fille de Caïn, scènes de la vie réelle
- Les Fredaines de Jean de Cérilly
- Le Fusil maudit, scènes de la vie de sport
- Les gasconnades de l'amour : scènes de la vie parisienne
- Histoire intime de la révolution du 18 mars, comité central et Commune
- Il était une fois... récits et nouvelles de toutes les couleurs...
- Le Paysan de l'Ukraine, épisode de l'insurrection polonaise
- Le Panier de pêches, one-act comédie en vaudevilles, by MM. Henry de Kock and Philibert Audebrand... [Paris, Vaudeville, 1 November 1857.]
- Menus propos, by René de Rovigo and Philibert Audebrand
- Feuilles volantes, by René de Rovigo and Philibert Audebrand

== Bibliography ==
- GROZIEUX DE LAGUERENNE, Lise, Journalistes et journaux dans les Mémoires de Philibert Audebrand, Mémoire de D.E.A. en Littérature française under the direction of Mr. Robert Ricatte, Paris, Sorbonne, 1960, 224p.
