= Jules Renard (vaudevilliste) =

French playwright and vaudevilliste (1813 – 1877)

Jules Renard (Paris, 1813 – Sèvres 1877) was a 19th-century French playwright and vaudevilliste.

== Works ==
- Cherubin ou la journée des aventures, comedy in five acts and six tableaux, premiered in Paris at the Théâtre des Délassements-Comiques, 15 September 1852, Vialat et Cie
- L'Hôtel des haricots, vaudeville in three acts with Delbès, premiered in Paris at the Théâtre de la Gaîté 18 January 1861, Pilloy, s.d.
- Un million dans le ventre, vaudeville in one act, premiered in Paris at the Théâtre des Variétés, 17 May 1857, M. Lévy, s.d.
- Même maison, vaudeville in 1 act, Théâtre du Palais-Royal, 4 May 1865, E. Dentu, 1865
- Une noce sur le carré, comédie-vaudeville in one act, Palais-Royal, 6 April 1868, E. Dentu, 1868
- Deux prisonniers de Théodoros, pochade abyssinienne in one act, new music by M. de Villebichot, E. Dentu, 1868
- Le Musée d'Anatole, vaudeville in one act, Palais-Royal, 17 August 1870, E. Dentu, 1871
- Un coup de vent, vaudeville in one act, Palais-Royal, 22 August 1867, E. Dentu, 1872
- La Clarinette postale, comédie-vaudeville in one act, Palais-Royal, 20 June 1873, Tresse, 1873
