= Alexandre Guyon =

French actor and singer (1829–1905)

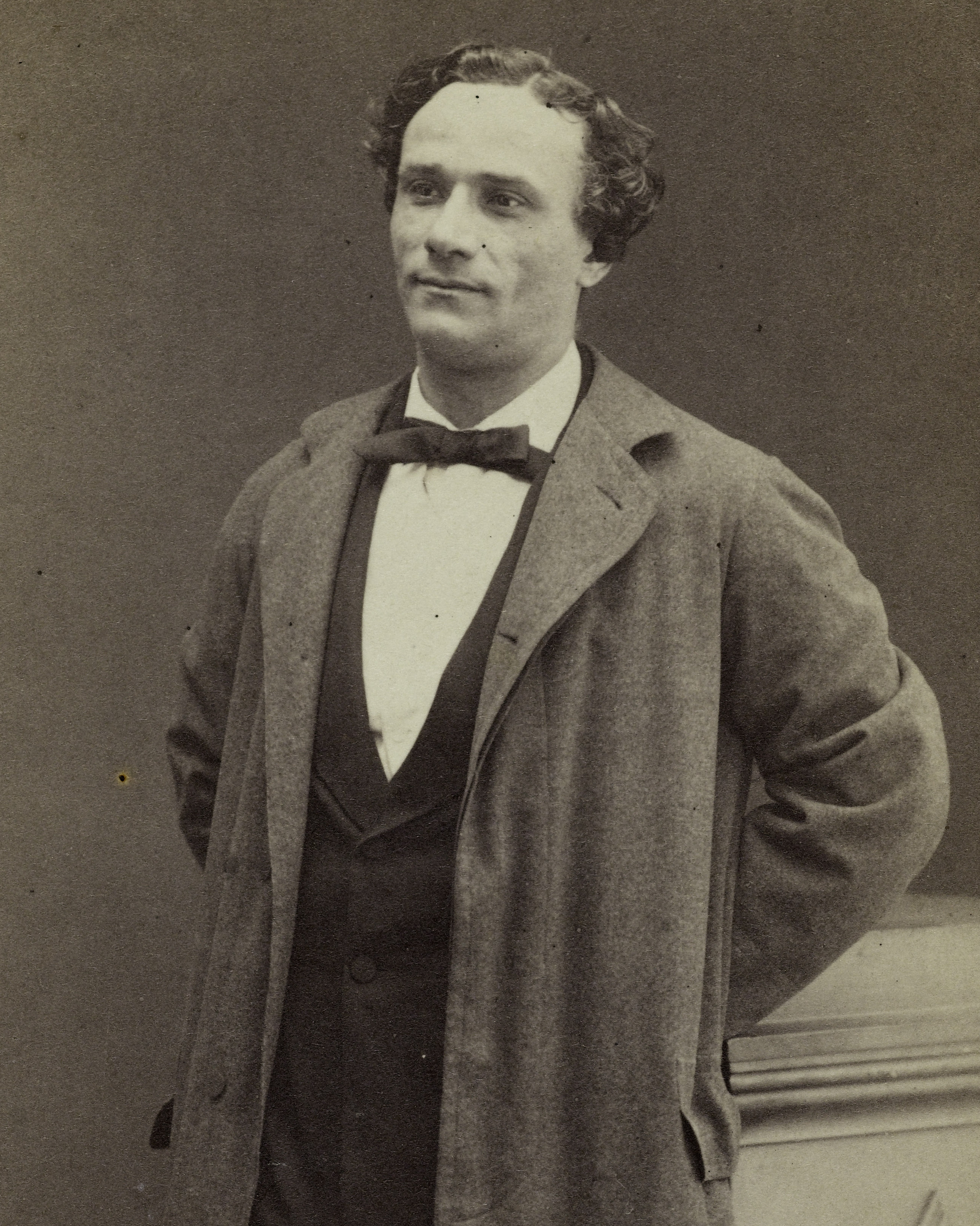
Image of Alexandre Guyon

Alexandre Guyon (1829–1905) was a French actor and singer who starred in numerous theatrical productions.

Guyon made his debut in 1845 and retired in 1895. He was married to actress Marie-Pauline Jarry (1836–1910). His sons, Charles-Alexandre Guyon and Aline Guyon, were also actors.
