= La perle du Brésil =

- Opera by Félicien David
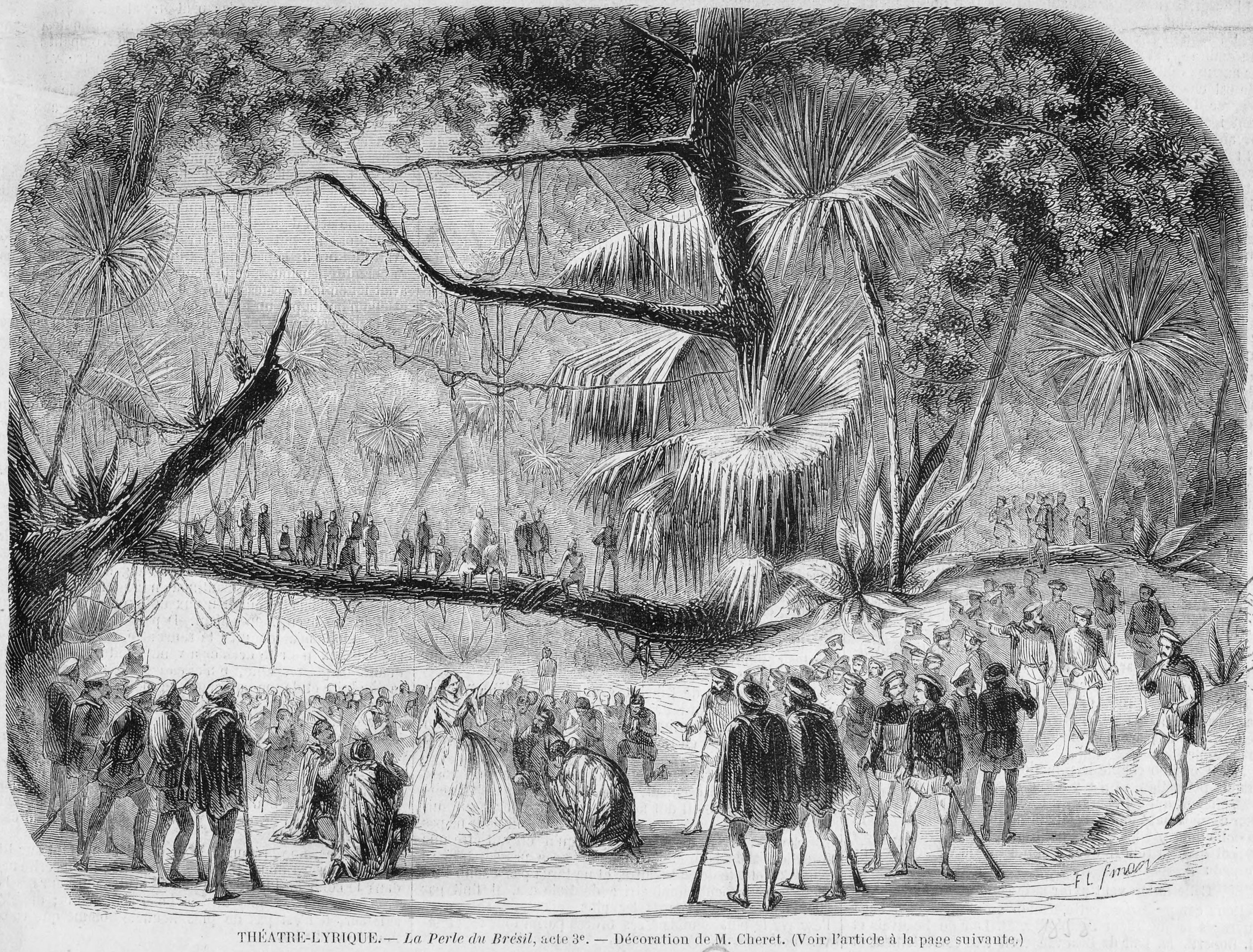
- Set design for act 3 by Jules Chéret for the 1851 premiere
- Librettist: J. Gabriel, Sylvain Saint-Étienne
- Language: French
- Premiere: 22 November 1851; Opéra-National

La perle du Brésil (The Pearl of Brazil) is an 1851 drame lyrique in 3 acts by composer Félicien David to a French-language libretto by J. Gabriel and Sylvain Saint-Étienne.

== Performance history ==
The opera was premiered on 22 November 1851 by the Opéra-National under Edmond Seveste at the Théâtre Historique on the Boulevard du Temple. Hector Berlioz described it as "sometimes good, often bad and in all, of little advantage to the composer". Nevertheless, it was the company's first popular success, being given an unusually long run of 68 performances during the next three years. A revised version of the opera was produced in 1858–59 by the same company under its new name, Théâtre Lyrique, and its new director, Léon Carvalho, with his wife Caroline Miolan-Carvalho as Zora, and again in 1863–64 at their new theatre on the Place du Châtelet, for a total of 144 performances. It was revived at the second Salle Favart by the Opéra-Comique under Léon Carvalho on 17 May 1883 with new spoken dialogue by Jules Barbier and several cuts and revisions to the score. The role of Zora was sung by Emma Nevada. This revival received 19 performances. The opera has also been performed in Brussels (5 November 1852) and Rouen (30 January 1889).

== Roles ==
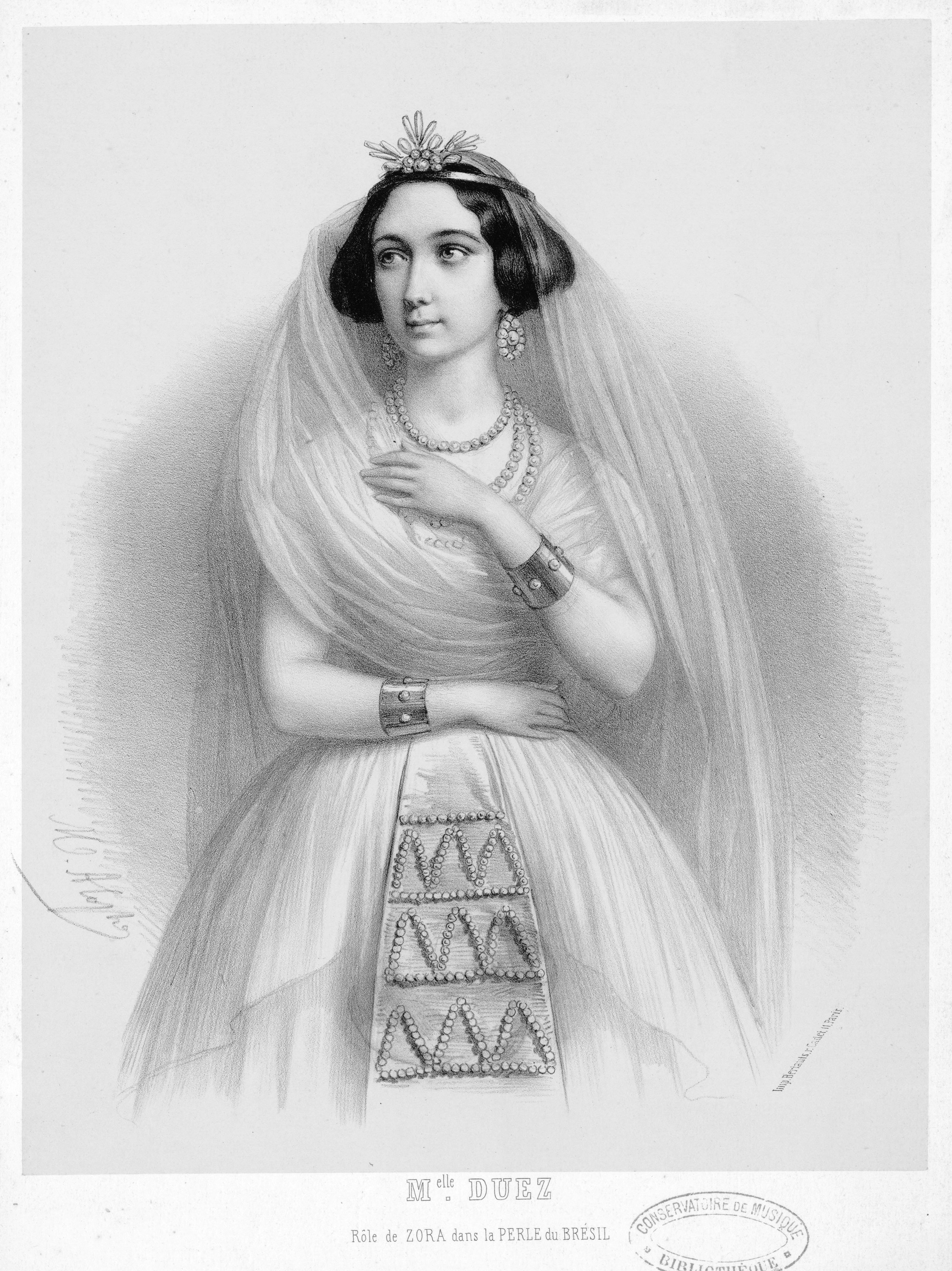
Zoé Adolphine Duez as Zora

Roles, voice types, premiere cast
Role	Voice type	Premiere cast, 22 November 1851
Zora, a young Brazilian	soprano	Zoë Duez
La Comtesse de Cavallos	soprano	Leontine Guichard
Don Salvador, Portuguese admiral	bass	Bouché
Lorenz, lieutenant of the palace guards	tenor	Philippe
Rio, a young sailor	tenor	Soyer
A Brazilian	bass	Junca
Chorus: Portuguese, naval officers, sailors, guards, Brazilians, three unknowns

== Synopsis ==
=== Act 1 ===
Palace of the Portuguese royal court

Zora, a young Brazilian native, was discovered in Brazil by Admiral Salvador, who brought her to Portugal and provided her with an education. She has become a favorite of the royal court, and the admiral intends to marry her. Lorenz, a young lieutenant, falls in love with her, and Salvador decides to take her back to Brazil.

=== Act 2 ===
On board ship

Lorenz, who has disguised himself as a sailor, is on board in order to be near his sweetheart. The admiral recognizes him and plans to avenge himself on his rival, but a storm intervenes. The ship is compelled to seek shelter in a harbor of Brazil.

=== Act 3 ===
In a Brazilian forest

Natives surround the passengers and crew, threaten them with tomahawks and almost overpower the sailors, when Zora sings a hymn to the Great Spirit. The Brazilians recognize their compatriot, fall to their knees and make peace. In gratitude for the young girl's act, which has saved all on board, the Admiral gives his consent for Zora to marry Lorenz.

== Music ==
"Charmant oiseau"
Recorded circa 1905 and sung by Ruth Vincent with flute obbligato by Albert Fransella

"Charmant oiseau"
Recorded in 1917 and sung by Amelita Galli-Curci with Clement Barone on flute, and Josef Pasternack conducting

Zora's "Charmant oiseau" ("Thou Charming Bird") with flute obbligato (act 3, scene 2, no. 13) is one of the most famous coloratura arias and has been recorded by Ruth Vincent, Luisa Tetrazzini, Emma Calvé, Amelita Galli-Curci, and Mabel Garrison. Zora's ballad "Entendez-vous dans les savanes" (act 1, scene 5, no. 3) is also notable.

== Bibliography ==
- Letellier, Robert Ignatius (2010). Opéra-Comique: A Sourcebook. Newcastle upon Tyne: Cambridge Scholars. ISBN 9781443821407.
- Loewenberg, Alfred (1978). Annals of Opera 1597–1940 (3rd, revised ed.). Totowa, New Jersey: Rowman and Littlefield. ISBN 9780874718515.
- Walsh, T. J. (1981). Second Empire Opera: The Théâtre Lyrique Paris 1851–1870. New York: Riverrun Press. ISBN 9780714536590.
- Wild, Nicole (1993). Décors et costumes du XIXe siècle. Tome II : Théâtres et décorateurs. Collections de la Bibliothèque – Musée de l'Opéra (in French). Paris: Bibliothèque Nationale. ISBN 2717718885.
