= Théâtre des Délassements-Comiques =

Théâtre des Délassements-Comiques (French pronunciation: [teɑtʁ de delasmɑ̃ kɔmik]) is a name that was used for a number of different theatres in Paris from 1785 to 1890.

== First (boulevard du Temple, 1785–1799) ==
The first Délassements-Comiques was a small theatre on the boulevard du Temple, originally located between the Hôtel Foulon (the site of the later Théâtre Historique) and the site of the later Cirque Olympique. It was opened in 1785 by the author, director and actor Plancher ('Aristide Valcour' 1751–1815). Burnt down on 2 February 1787, it was rebuilt and reopened in 1788 and continued until 1799.

The theatre was popular and this excited the jealousy of other neighbouring theatres, resulting in a regulation against productions other than pantomimes and the employment of more than three actors at the same time, unless obscured by a gauze curtain. On 14 July 1789, the day of the storming of the Bastille, Plancher Valcour tore down the gauze curtain in his theatre with the cry of "Vive la liberté!"

In 1792 the theatre was taken over by Colon.

In 1801, the building took the name of the Théâtre Lyri-Comique, only to close in the following year. It then became the third Théâtre des Variétés-Amusantes in 1803, followed by the Nouveaux Troubadours in 1805. The latter was forced to close in 1807 as a result of Napoleon's decree on the theatres. Most of the building was demolished except for the entry hall, which continued to be used for exhibiting trained dogs and monkeys performing tricks.

== Second (boulevard du Temple, 1804–1806) ==
A second theatre with the name Délassements-Comiques, also on the boulevard du Temple, operated from 1804 to 1806.

== Third (boulevard du Temple, 1841–1864) ==
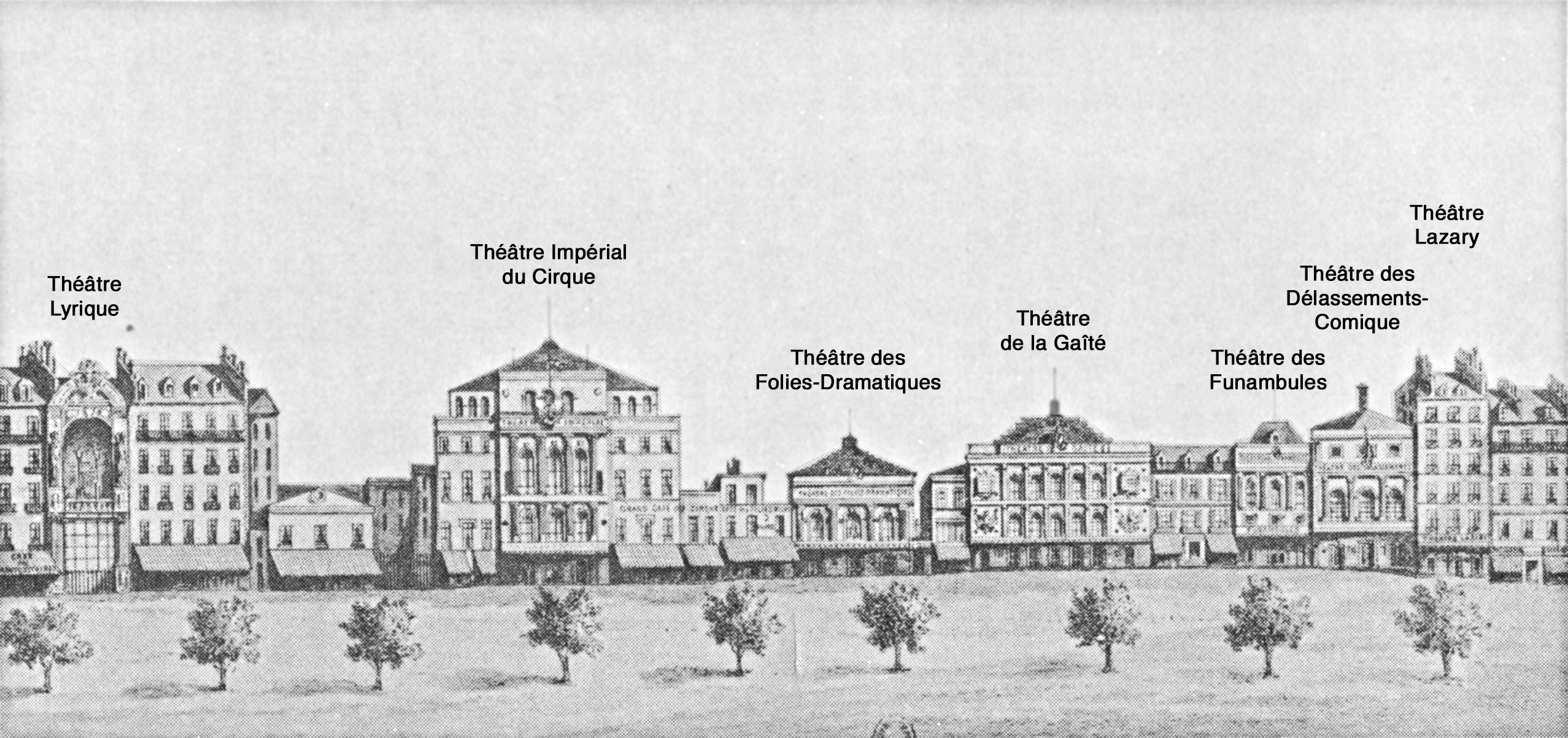
Theatres on the boulevard du Temple, ca. 1862. The Théâtre des Délassements-Comiques is second from the right.

On 12 December 1816, Madame Saqui, the tightrope-walker (or 'dancer') bought the Café d'Apollon, site of the old Théâtre des Associés, located at 52 boulevard de Temple, between the Théâtre des Funambules and the Théâtre du Petit-Lazari. Her new theatre was known as the Spectacle des Acrobates de Madame Saqui, but it closed in 1832 and was replaced with Dorsay's Théâtre du Temple. After renovation in 1841, a third theatre re-using the old name Délassements-Comiques opened at this location.

The popular cancan dancer Marguerite Badel ('Rigolboche') appeared there from 1858 to 1860.

With Haussmann's renovation of Paris the building on the boulevard du Temple was slated for demolition, and the company relocated to the 26 rue de Provence on 30 May 1862, finally closing in January 1864.

== Fourth (boulevard du Prince Eugène, 1866–1871) ==
On 15 February 1866 a fourth theatre using the name Délassements-Comiques opened at 23 boulevard du Prince Eugène (today the boulevard Voltaire). Within a few months its name changed to Théâtre du Prince Eugène, but the name Délassements-Comiques was restored in 1867. The theatre presented Hervé's Les contes de fées on 5 March 1871. The theatre was destroyed by fire during the last days of the Paris Commune in 1871.

== Fifth (rue du Faubourg-Saint-Martin, 1873–1878) ==
The troupe re-opened in 1873 in the building of the second Théâtre des Nouveautés (on the rue du Faubourg-Saint-Martin) and continued to operate until 1878. Robert Planquette's 1-act operetta Paille d'avoine was presented on 12 March 1874, as well as Hervé's La noce à Briochet on 26 April 1874.

== Sixth (1886–1890) ==
A sixth Délassements-Comiques ran from 1886 to 1890.

== See also ==
- Théâtre des Nouveautés
