= Opéra-National =

Former opera company in Paris

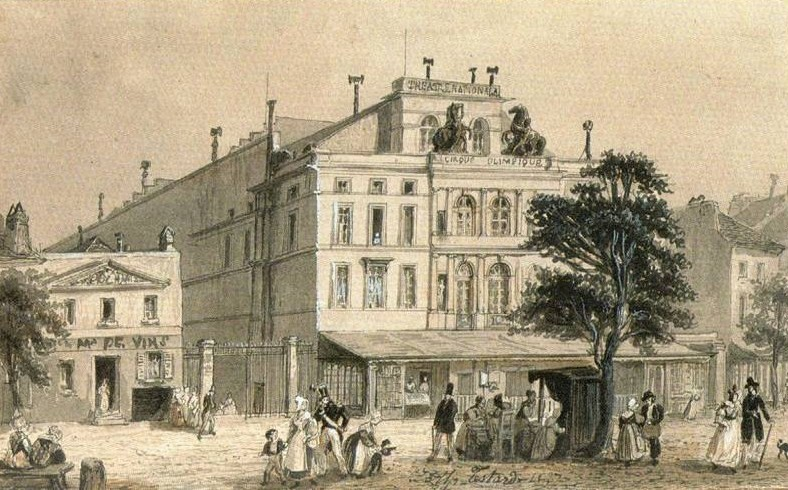
The Cirque Olympique on the Boulevard du Temple, the first theatre of the Opéra-National

The Opéra-National (French pronunciation: [ɔpeʁa nɑsjɔnal]) was a Parisian opera company that the French composer Adolphe Adam founded in 1847 to provide an alternative to the two primary French opera companies in Paris, the Opéra and the Opéra-Comique. The goals of the new company were to "foster new compositional talent," revive opéras comiques from an earlier period, and produce opera at a lower ticket price for a wider public.

The company first performed in the relatively large Cirque Olympique on the Boulevard du Temple, in a working class district of Paris. Financial difficulties and the turmoil of the 1848 Revolution caused the company to close in March of that year. It was revived under a new director, Edmond Seveste, in 1851, when it moved to the Théâtre Historique, a short distance away on the Boulevard du Temple. In 1852 the company was renamed Théâtre Lyrique and operated under that name until 1872.

== Background ==
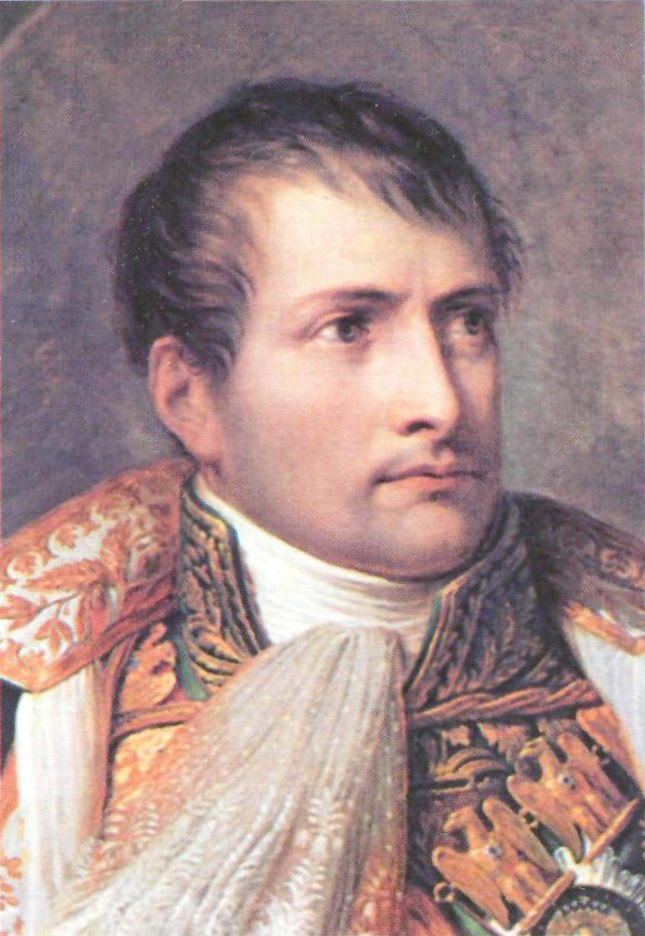
Napoleon

In 1791, during the French Revolution, many restrictions on theatres were removed. New laws allowed essentially anyone to open a theatre. Developers founded many new theatres, and it became increasingly difficult for any, including state sponsored theatres, to make money. On 8 June 1806 Napoleon issued a decree that regulated the opening of new theatres. No person could open a theatre without the approval of the emperor, based on a proposal prepared and submitted by the minister of the interior. On 25 April 1807 he enacted a second, more highly developed decree that determined the genres permitted at each theatre. Any theatre wanting to stage a work in the repertory of the state-supported Opéra, the Comédie-Française, or the Opéra-Comique had to pay a fee to the management of the appropriate company. In addition, only the Opéra could perform particular historical and mythological ballets, thus burdening several companies, particularly the Théâtre de la Porte-Saint-Martin.

In spite of these measures, the situation continued to worsen, and on 29 July 1807 Napoleon decided that only eight theatres (four primary and four secondary) could continue to operate. The primary theatres were the Opéra, the Comédie-Française, the Opéra-Comique, and the Théâtre de l'Impératrice (Théâtre-Italien). The four secondary theatres were the Vaudeville, the Variétés, the Gaité, and the Ambigu-Comique. The other twenty-five or so existing theatres had to close by 15 August. Venues for the performance of French-language opera were reduced to two: the Opéra and the Opéra-Comique.

After Napoleon's downfall, licenses for new theatres began to increase, and the enforcement of restrictions on genre began to relax. Official censors were more concerned with content rather than genre. Opéra comique was given at the Théâtre du Gymnase as early as 1820. From 1824 to 1829 operas, such as Rossini's Il barbiere di Siviglia and Mozart's Le nozze di Figaro and Don Giovanni, were produced at the Théâtre Lyrique de l'Odéon. From 1827 to 1831 opéra-comique and French adaptations of Rossini and Mozart were presented at the Théâtre des Nouveautés. After the July Revolution of 1830, restrictions loosened even more, and beginning in 1838 opéras-comiques and operas, including the premiere of Donizetti's Lucie de Lammermoor (the French adaptation of his Lucia di Lammermoor), were presented at the Théâtre de la Renaissance. None at these theatres presented operas exclusively, however. In fact, opera represented a very small part of their repertory. Moreover, all of these endeavours were short-lived attempts. The latter theatre failed in mid-1841.

As early as 14 May 1842, several composers, including Hector Berlioz, Ambroise Thomas, and Adolphe Adam, petitioned administrative authorities to create a permanent third opera house in Paris. A commission was established, and by August plans for a new theatre were announced. However, on 28 October the petition was rejected. In September 1844 a second petition was submitted by winners of the Prix de Rome, requesting the establishment of a new lyric theatre dedicated to works of younger, lesser known composers and librettists. This petition was also rejected. Finally in 1847, on the third attempt, one composer, Adolphe Adam, succeeded.

== At the Cirque Olympique under Adolphe Adam (1847–1848) ==
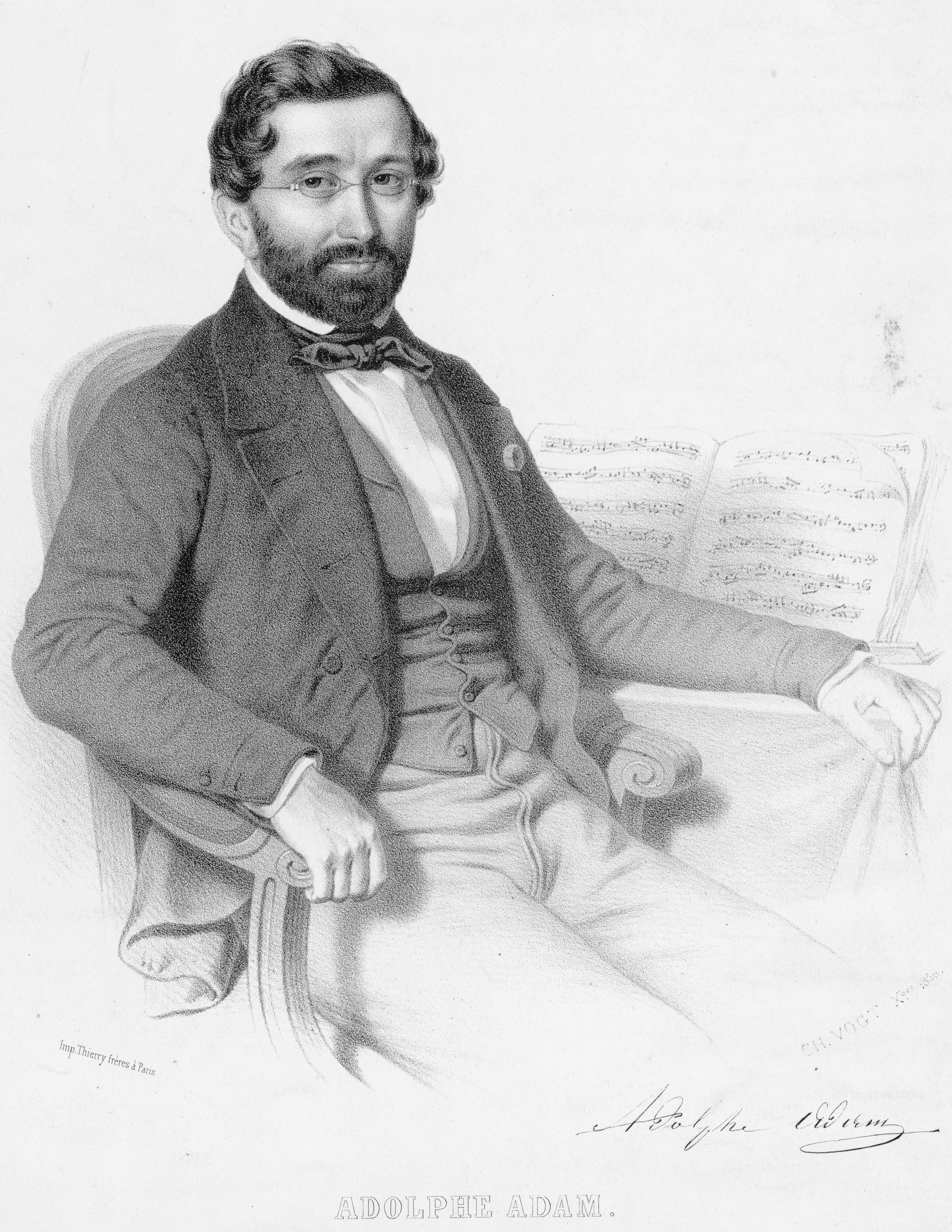
Adolphe Adam

In 1847 Adolphe Adam, with the help of his friend François Louis Crosnier—a former director of the Opéra-Comique and current manager of the Théâtre de la Porte Saint-Martin—obtained a license to open the Opéra-National. The license allowed Adam to perform many of his works that had previously been in the repertory of the Opéra-Comique. The stated aims of the new company were to bring French opera to a wider public and provide a performance venue for younger, less well-established French composers. Adam first intended to use Crosnier's theatre at the Porte Saint-Martin, but Crosnier found it more financially rewarding to rent that theatre to others.

Adam had to find another venue. With his license in hand and a partnership with Achille Mirecour, he acquired the Cirque Olympique (66 Boulevard du Temple) for 1,400,000 francs. The theatre had been designed as an indoor equestrian circus (founded by the British impresario Philip Astley). At a cost of 200,000 francs, it was renovated and altered for use as an opera house by the architect Louis Charles Théodore Charpentier. Having a capacity of 2400, it was unusually large, so the acoustics were less than ideal, but the stage projected into the auditorium, which was a help to the singers.

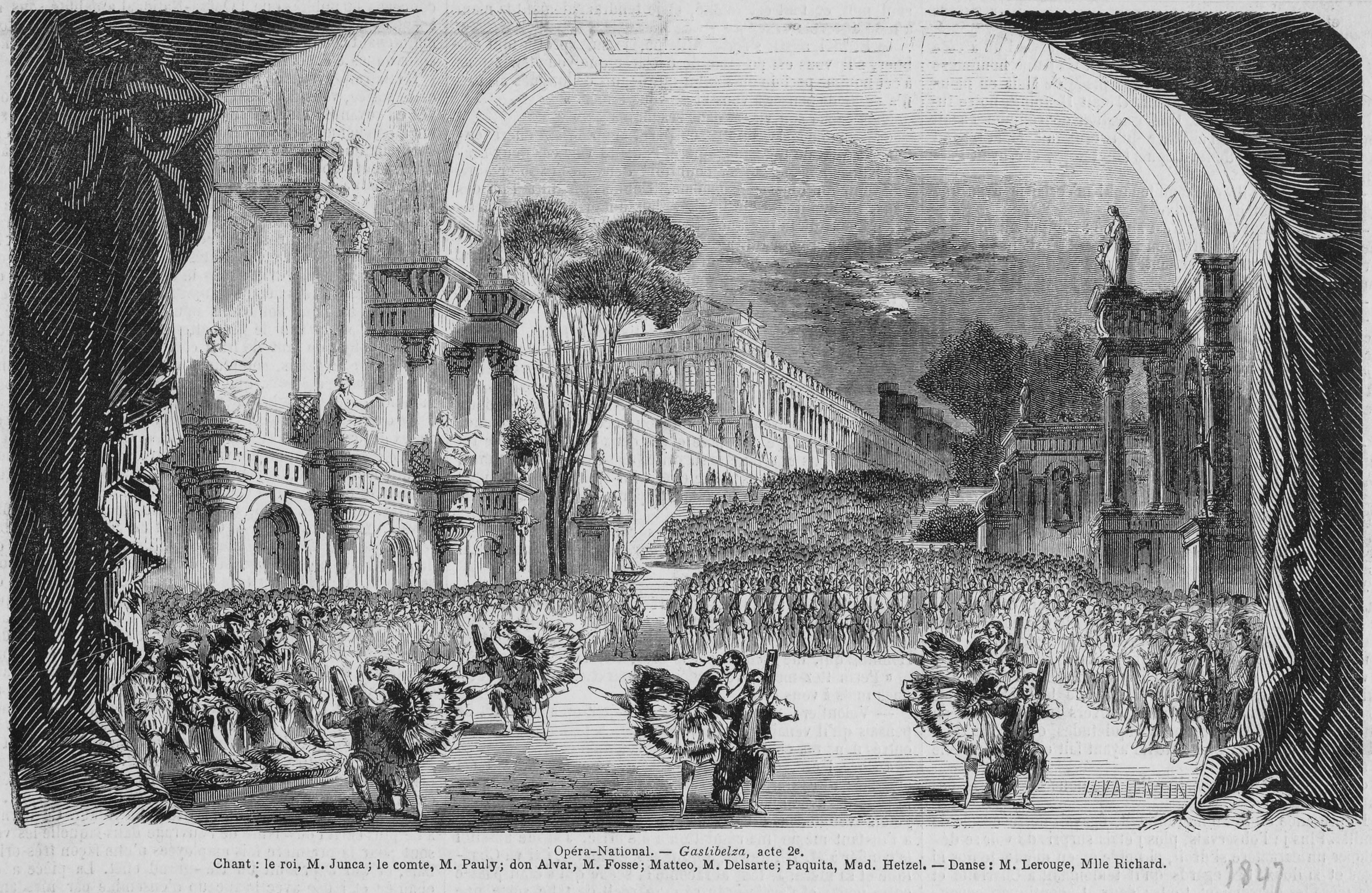
Aimé Maillart's Gastibelza at the Opéra-National (1847)

The theatre opened on 15 November 1847 with a musical prologue (Les premiers pas ou Les deux génies) and the premiere of a 3-act opera Gastibelza. The opera had a libretto by Adolphe d'Ennery and Eugène Cormon, and music by Aimé Maillart. The prologue, a pastiche with music by Adam, Daniel Auber, Fromental Halévy, and Michele Carafa, and a libretto by Alphonse Royer and Gustave Vaëz, was highly topical, with references to the new railway from Paris to Tours (a technical wonder of the time) and the Boulevard du Crime (nickname of the Boulevard du Temple, for the numerous melodramas about sensational crimes performed in many of the theatres located there).

Subsequent early productions included:

- 16 November 1847 – a revival of the 3-act opéra-comique Aline, reine de Goconde by Henri Montan Berton, first performed at the Salle Feydeau on 3 September 1803, and re-orchestrated by Adam for the revival
- 23 November 1847 – a revival of the 1-act opéra-comique Une bonne fortune by Adam, first performed by the Opéra-Comique on 23 January 1834 at the Salle de la Bourse
- 22 December 1847 – a revival of the 3-act opéra-comique Félix, ou L'enfant trouvé by Pierre-Alexandre Monsigny with a libretto by Michel-Jean Sedaine, first performed at Fontainebleau on 10 November 1777, repeated at the Hôtel de Bourgogne on 24 November, and revived at the Salle Feydeau on 23 November 1801; re-orchestrated by Adam for the revival
- 22 January 1848 – a revival of the 3-act opéra-comique Le brasseur de Preston by Adam, first performed at the Salle de la Bourse on 31 October 1838
- 30 January 1848 – a revival of the 1-act opéra-comique La tête de Méduse by Scard with a libretto by Louis-Émile Vanderburch and Philippe-August Deforges

The company had financial difficulties from the very beginning, and its artistic achievement was minimal. The Musical World of 22 January 1848 wrote that one performance "obtained but a mediocre success owing to the detestable style in which it was executed," adding that "the singers were frightful, the chorus almost as bad as those at the Italiens, and worse than those at the Opéra Comique; the orchestra weak and coarse."

Further troubles came with the outbreak of the 1848 Revolution on 23 February 1848. The turmoil forced the closure of all theatres for several days. A condition of reopening was the donation of initial receipts for the care of the wounded. On 6 March Adam's company premiered the 1-act Les Barricades de 1848 (libretto by Édouard Brisebarre and Saint-Yves; music by Pilati and Eugène Gautier). All the theatres were presenting similar patriotic occasional pieces, and although the program also included Hervé's 1-act Don Quichotte et Sancho Pança, later described by Reynaldo Hahn as "irresistible buffoonery", audiences were sparse. Adam soon exhausted his sources of money. With massive debts he closed the theatre on 28 March 1848 and retired from his position of opera director.

== At the Théâtre Historique under Edmond Seveste (1851–1852) ==
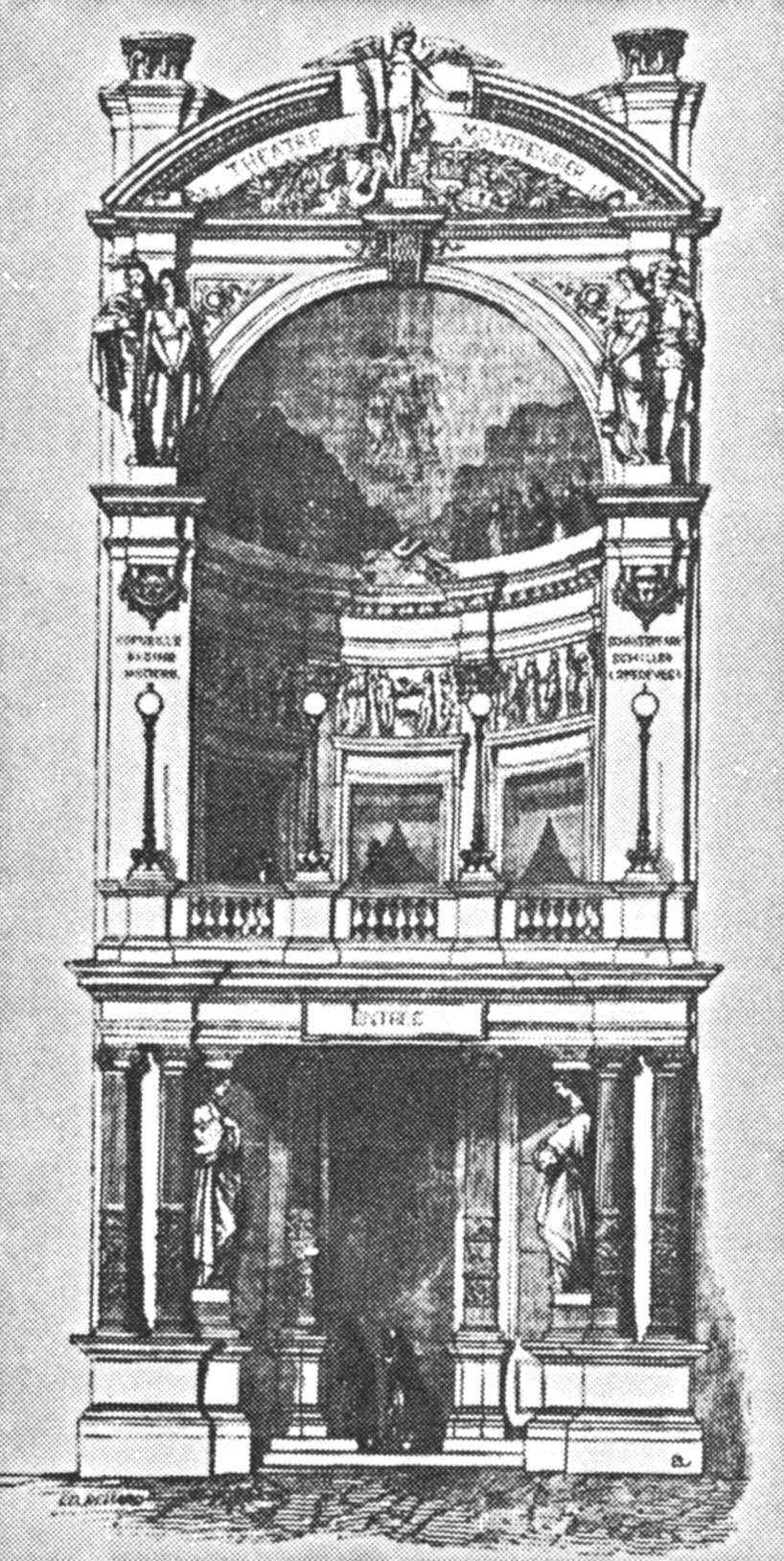
Design of the facade of the Théâtre Historique

In 1851, the Opéra-National was revived, and on 1 May Edmond Seveste was appointed director. By the end of July he had taken a lease on the Théâtre Historique (72 Boulevard du Temple). Built by the dramatist Alexandre Dumas, the theatre had opened on 20 February 1847, closed on 20 December 1850, and remained unused. The entrance to the theatre was a long, narrow vestibule, squeezed between two other buildings, with a facade only eight meters wide. The auditorium, located in the back, was unusually wide (20 meters) and only 16 meters deep. It had an audience capacity of 1500–1700 and was thought to have excellent acoustics for opera.

The theatre required minimal renovations for its new purpose: new paint of white and gold, some furnishings, and a drop curtain painted by Auguste Rubé. Four candelabra were fastened to the columns of the stage boxes and the busts of Corneille and Molière were replaced with ones of Gluck and Lully. A grand piano surmounted with a bust of Weber was installed in the foyer. Structural alterations were made to some ancillary spaces, including the conversion of stables used for horses in Dumas's historical dramas, into the musicians' green room.

While work on the theatre was in progress, rehearsals were held at the Salle Ventadour. Alphonse Varney, who had conducted the orchestra at Théâtre Historique under Dumas, had been hired as the conductor of the newly revived Opéra-National. Of note among the singers who had been engaged were the baritone Auguste Meillet, his wife, the soprano Marie-Stéphanie Meillet (née Meyer); and the bass Marcel Junca.

=== Cahier des charges ===
The company's new cahier des charges (license) was liberal. It called for new French operas with spoken dialogue (opéra comique) or sung recitative, prose or verse librettos, and with or without ballets. No single composer could have more than six new acts presented in one season (acts were counted rather than works). Preference was to be given to Prix de Rome winners up to two years after the award. In addition, up to two translated foreign works were permitted, as well as French works ten years after their premiere, and any number of public domain works, so long as these did not exceed 33% of the number of new acts presented over a two-year period. The company had the right to revive any works it had already produced, to encourage the company to establish its own repertory. As the company did not receive any state subsidy before 1864, revivals of popular, established works were critical to its financial survival.

=== Opening and first season ===
The new opera house opened on 27 September 1851 with the premiere of a 3-act opéra-comique with music by Xavier Boisselot called Mosquita la sorcière. The libretto was by Eugène Scribe and Gustave Vaëz. Hector Berlioz, who reviewed the performance, was not particularly taken with the music of Boisselot, but gave the chorus high marks. The orchestra conducted by Varney was praised as young and energetic by the Moniteur Universel. The opera was performed a total of 21 times that year but only 4 times the next. Boisselot's new opera was followed the next night with Le barbier de Séville (a French adaptation by Castil-Blaze of Rossini's Il barbiere di Siviglia) and Ferdinando Paer's Le maître de chapelle, both more reliable money-makers. The company performed the former a total of 126 times, and the latter, 182 times. In fact this was to become the pattern later in the history of the company: occasional new operas among numerous French language revivals of popular foreign works.

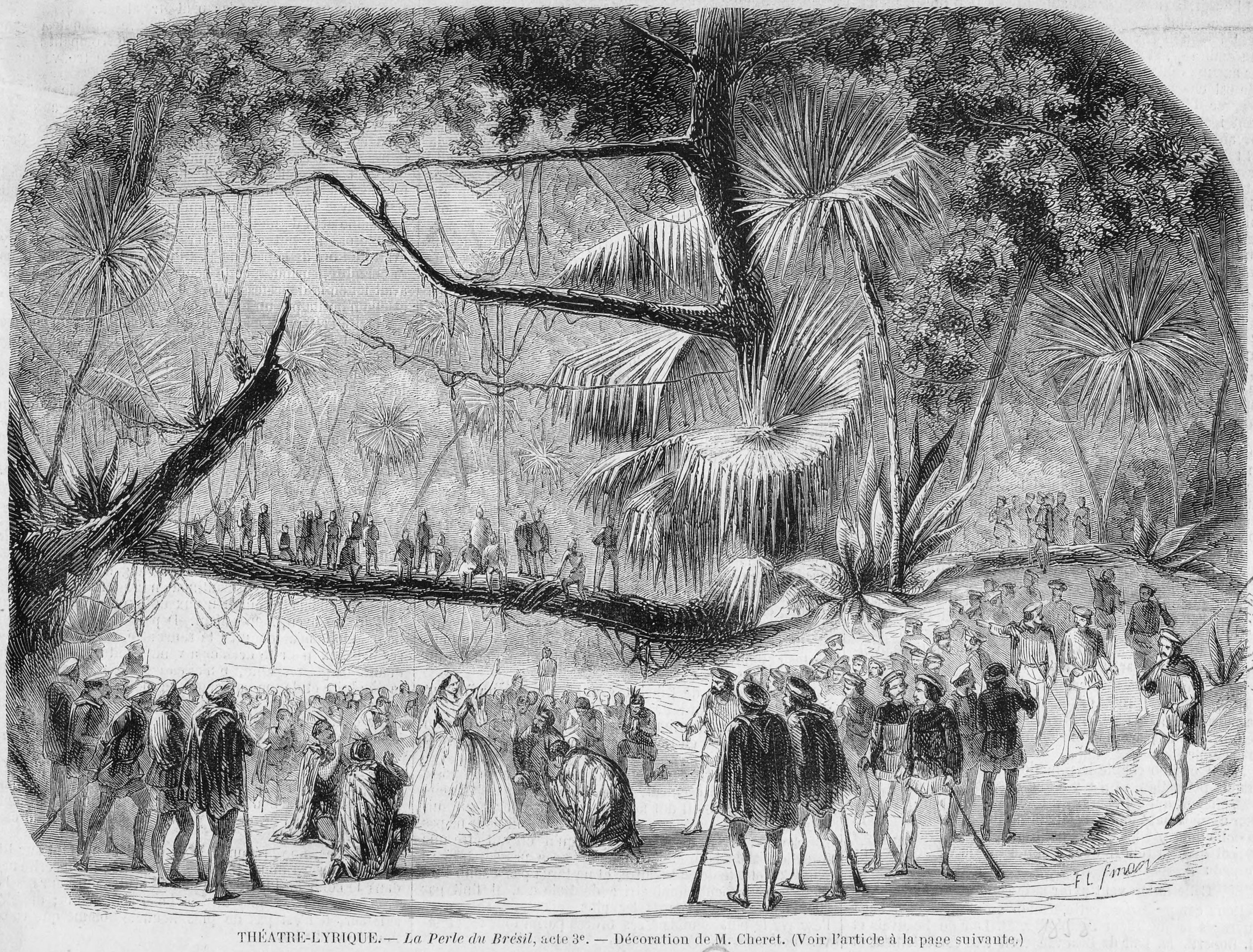
Act 3 of Félicien David's La perle du Brésil (1851)

Perhaps the most successful new French work that first season was Felicien David's La perle du Brésil, first performed on 22 November. Although the production was apparently not up to snuff (Berlioz reported that it was "sometimes good, often bad and in all, of little advantage to the composer"), it nevertheless received 17 performances before the end of that year, 47 the next, and a total of 144 by the company.

The year 1852 brought another memorable new work, a one-act opéra-comique by Adolphe Adam called La poupée de Nuremberg, which premiered on 21 February with 47 performances that year and 98 total by the company. Its success was somewhat tarnished by the death of Edmond Seveste on 28 February. His brother Jules Seveste became temporary director and was officially appointed to the post on 1 May from a field of 20 applicants that included the tenor Gilbert Duprez. The very next new production was Duprez's 3-act opera Joanita (a revision of his earlier L'abime de la maladetta), which opened on 11 March and starred his daughter, soprano Caroline Duprez, who had already created the lead soprano role of the first version in Brussels on 19 November 1851 and would go on to create the role of Catherine in Meyerbeer's L'étoile du nord at the Opéra-Comique in 1854.

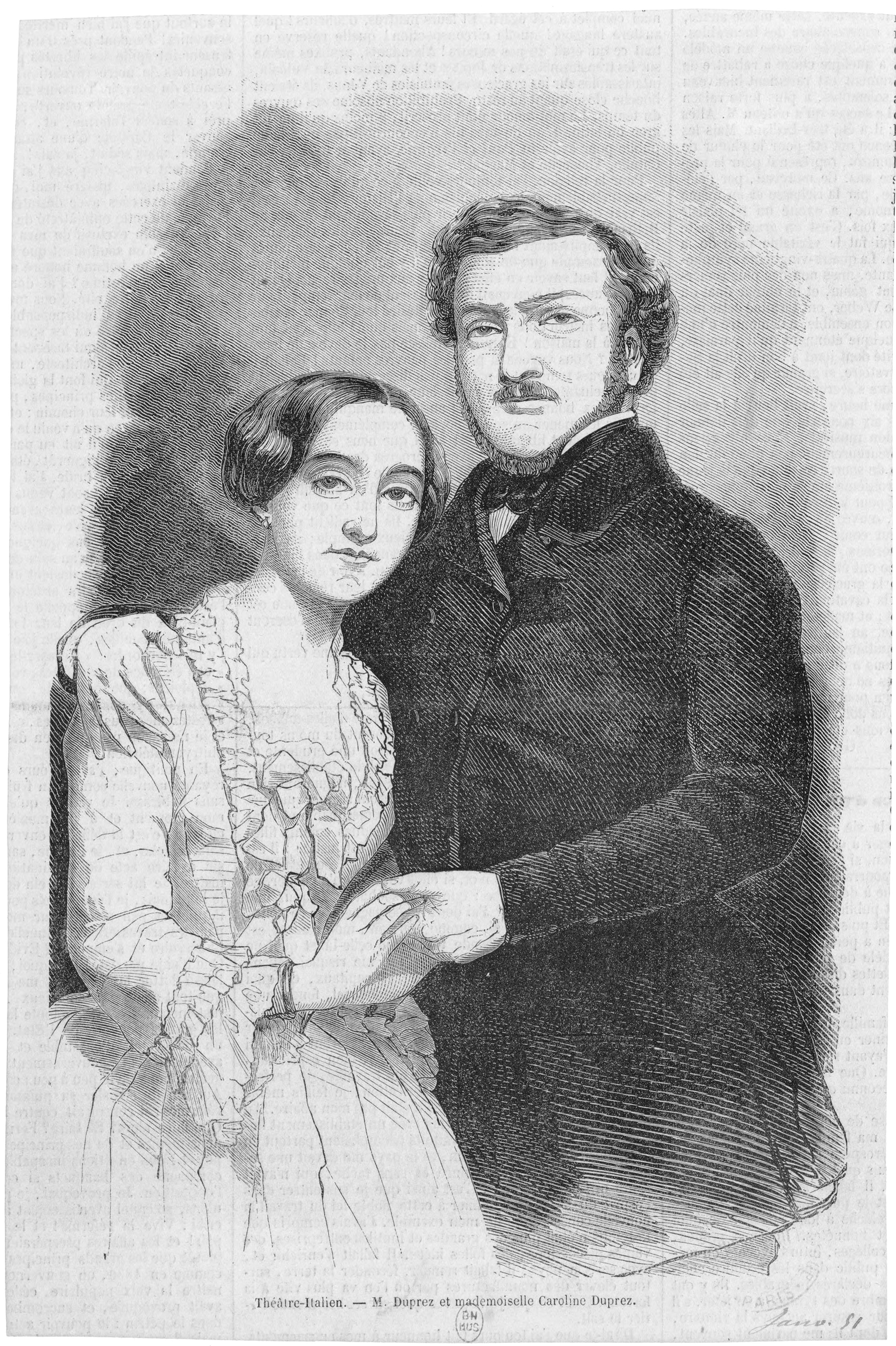
Gilbert Duprez and his daughter Caroline in 1851

On 12 April, during Joanita's short run of 15 performances, the management decided to change the name of the company to Théâtre Lyrique. As attendance was falling rapidly, Joanita was replaced with La pie voleuse, a Castil-Blaze adaptation of Rossini's La gazza ladra, on 23 April. However, they only performed it seven times, as the season was almost over. The season had run from late September to the end of April, a pattern repeated in later seasons, which usually ran from September or early October to May, or sometimes even into the summer. Jules Seveste sought a state subsidy of 50,000 francs for the following year, but it was too late; the budget had already been finalized. In addition, the conductor Alphonse Varney resigned his position and went to Ghent so he would have more time for composition. He was replaced by his assistant conductor, Auguste Francis Placet, and the violinist Adolphe Deloffre, who had recently returned to Paris from London, was made assistant conductor.
