= The Card Sharp on the Boulevard =

Painting by Louis-Léopold Boilly

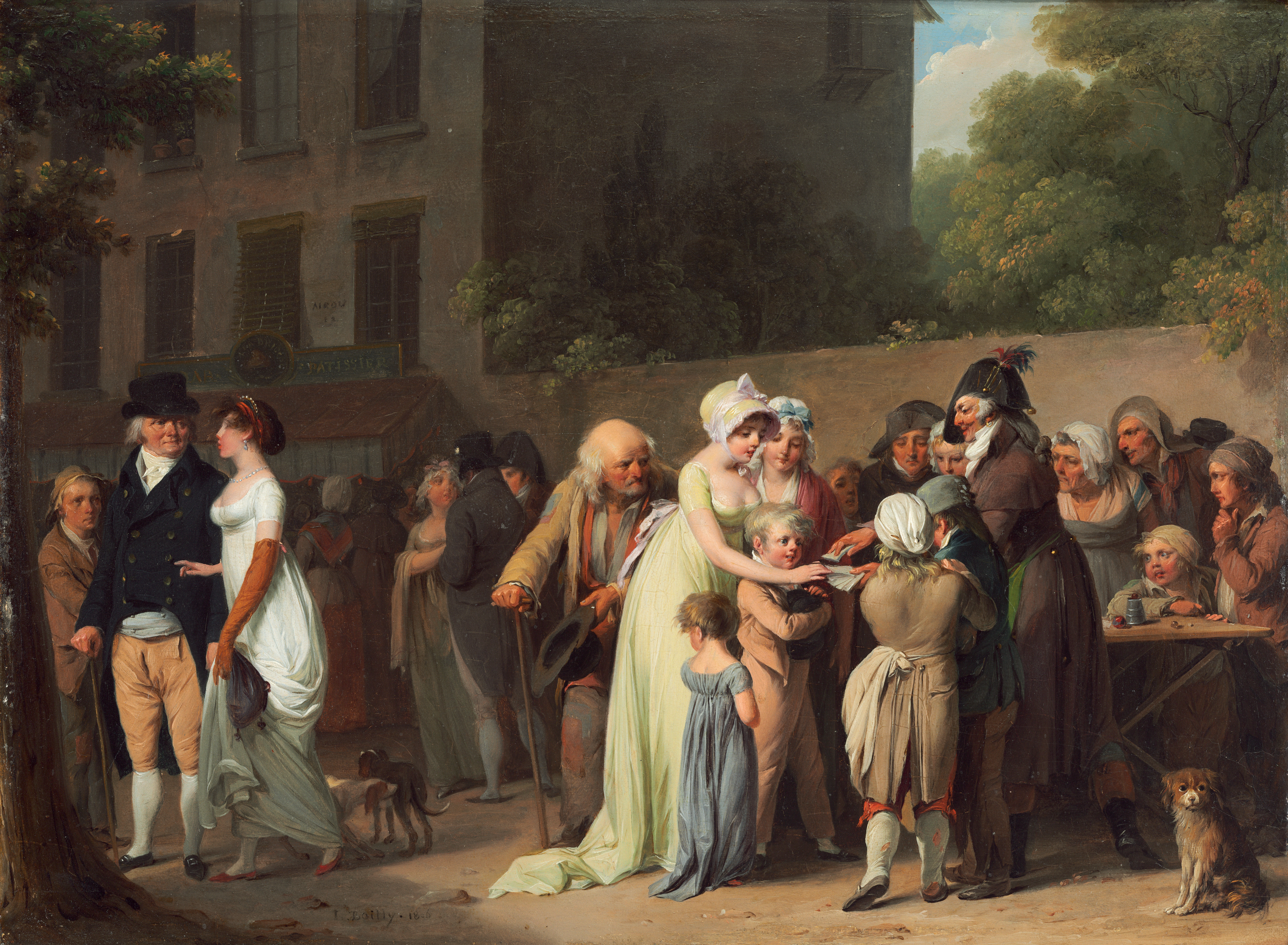
- Artist: Louis-Léopold Boilly
- Year: 1806
- Type: Oil on panel, genre painting
- Dimensions: 24 cm × 33 cm (9.4 in × 13 in)
- Location: National Gallery of Art, Washington D.C.

The Card Sharp on the Boulevard is an oil on panel genre painting by the French artist Louis-Léopold Boilly, from 1806. It is held in the collection of the National Gallery of Art, in Washington.

It depicts a scene on the Boulevard du Temple in Napoleonic era Paris, with a conjuror or card sharp on the right, entertaining a crowd. A group of children and women seem to be vividly interested by the tricksters actions. The artist added a self-portrait of himself in a bicorne hat amongst the group of spectators.

Boilly exhibited the painting at the Salon of 1808 at the Louvre, along with a pendant piece Young Savoyards Showing Their Marmot. It was also displayed at the Salon of 1814, which was hastily organised following the Bourbon Restoration.

== Bibliography ==
- Bailey, Colin B. The Age of Watteau, Chardin, and Fragonard: Masterpieces of French Genre Painting. Yale University Press, 2003.
- Eitner, Lorenz. French Paintings of the Nineteenth Century: Before impressionism. National Gallery of Art, 2000.
