= Don Quichotte et Sancho Pança =

Don Quichotte et Sancho Pança is a one-act 'tableau grotesque' or 'grotesque scene' with music by Hervé after Cervantes, first produced in 1847, which has been dubbed ‘the first French operetta’, and a precursor of the opéra bouffe.

Don Quichotte et Sancho Pança was conceived as a vehicle for Desiré, a friend of Hervé, who had requested a piece for a benefit performance. Desiré, short and plump as Sancho, was pitted against the tall and thin Quichotte of Hervé. The piece was staged the following year on 6 March 1848 at Adolphe Adam's Opéra-National at the Cirque Olympique (with Hervé again playing Quichotte, and Joseph Kelm as Sancho), in a double-bill with Les barricades de 1848.

Hervé recalled that the success of his piece led to the tunes becoming very popular in the vaudevilles of Paris and hummed all around the city. The most popular couplet was:

Je sais que les filles
Sont vraiment gentilles
Et que tous les drilles
En sont amoureux.
Mais sous l'aubépine,
La corde argentine
De ma mandoline
Sait me rendre heureux;
Oui, ma guitarine
Sait me rendre heureux.
