= Boulevard du Temple (photograph) =

First photograph to show people

Coordinates: 48°51′59.2″N 2°21′53.4″E

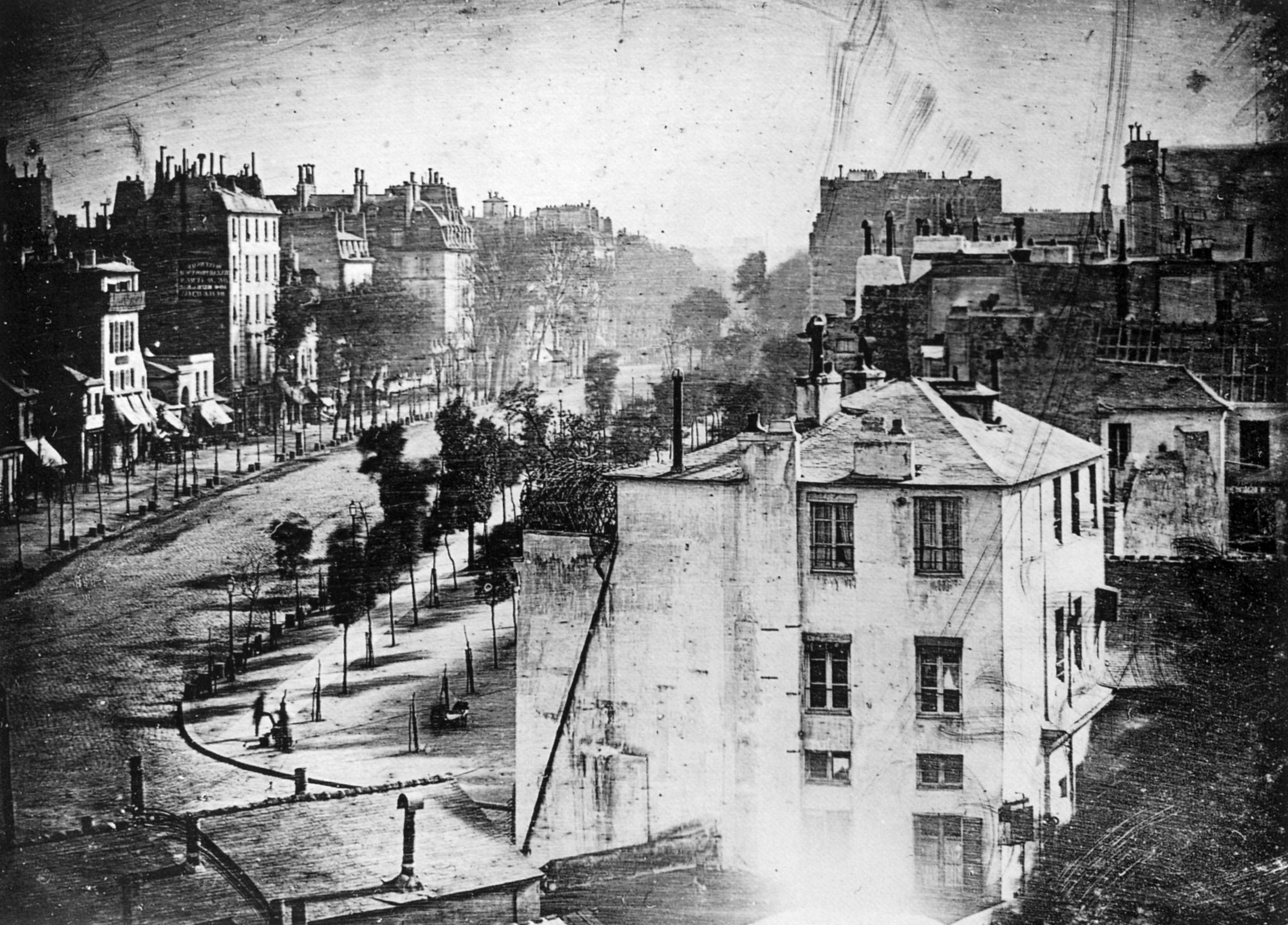
Daguerre's daguerreotype taken at 8:00 AM

Boulevard du Temple is a photograph of a Parsian streetscape made in 1838 (or possibly 1837), and is one of the earliest surviving daguerreotype plates produced by Louis Daguerre. Although the image seems to be of a deserted street, it is widely considered to be the earliest surviving photograph to include an image of a human.

== Daguerreotype ==
The earliest known photograph, the heliographic View from the Window at Le Gras, had been produced some ten years earlier using a technique that required multiple eight-hour exposures, which meant that only static objects could be recorded. However, by 1838, Daguerre had developed his own method whereby the exposure was reduced to only four to five minutes.

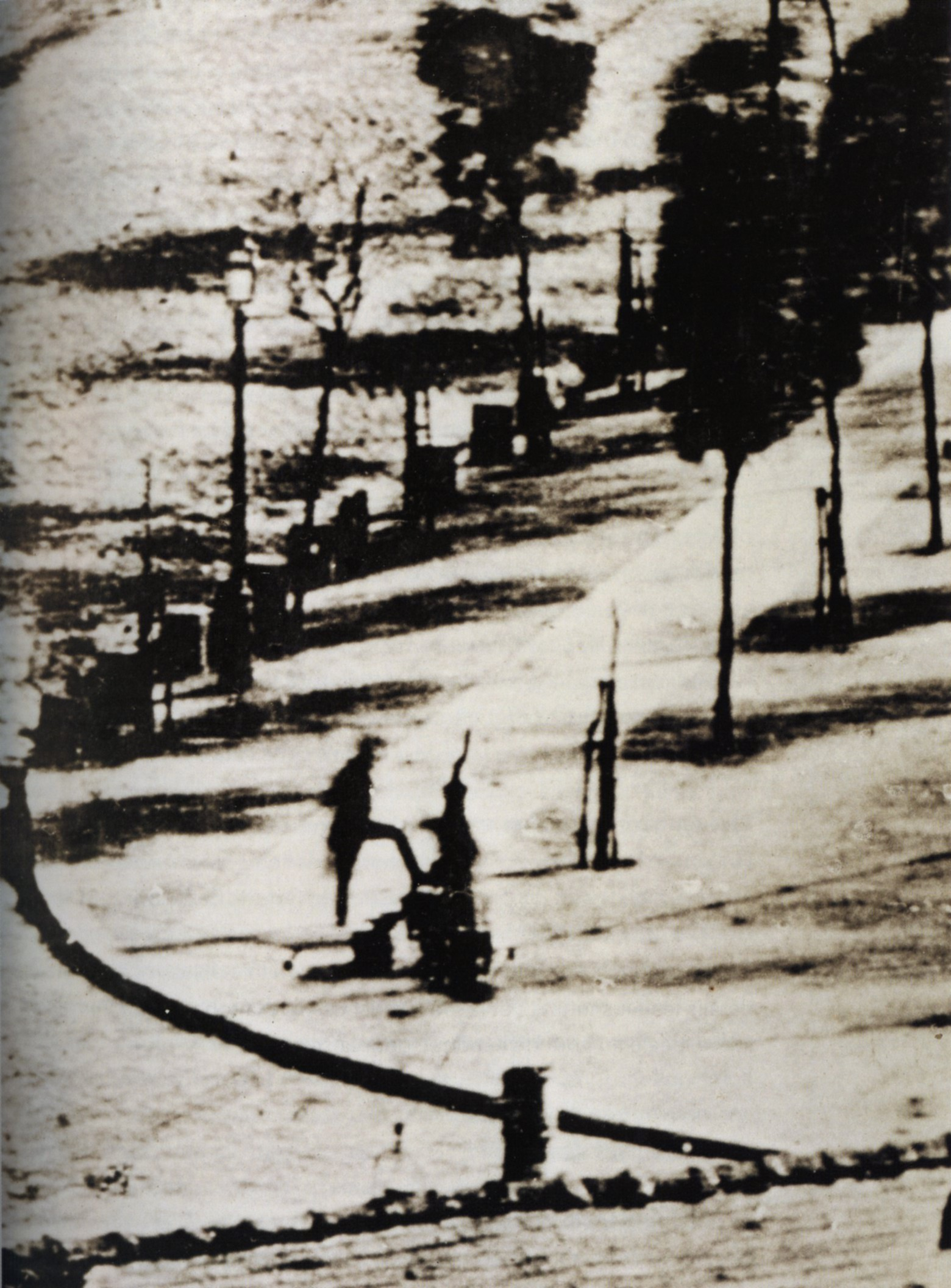
Crop showing people photographed

The photograph was taken at 8:00 AM between 24 April and 4 May, either in 1837 or 1838, from a window in Daguerre's studio beside the Diorama de Louis Daguerre at 5 Rue des Marais, behind the Place du Château-d'Eau in Paris. This was at a time before the Place de la République had been built, and the location is where now Rue du Faubourg du Temple joins the Place de la République. Two other images were taken on the same day, one at midday, which survives, as well as a third plate in the evening, which has since been lost. The plate is about 13 by 16 centimetres (5 by 6 in). The Boulevard du Temple would have been busy with people and horse traffic, but because an exposure time of four to five minutes would have been required, the only people recorded were two keeping still – a bootblack and his customer, at the corner of the street shown at lower left of the plate. It has been speculated, however, that this is not a bootblack, but a water pump.

== Publication and exhibition ==
Daguerre first publicly announced his invention to the French Académie des Sciences in January 1839. In early March 1839, a fire destroyed his studio. Daguerre urged the firefighters to let his studio burn, but to save his adjacent house, which contained his laboratory. The daguerreotype apparatus and pictures, documents, and household linen were rescued. His notebook, which contained his experiments, was reportedly found ten days later. However, only 25 daguerreotypes are left which can be definitely attributed to Daguerre.

Daguerre showed this image to Samuel Morse at his studio in March 1839. Morse later described this daguerreotype in a letter that was published in April 1839 in The New York Times. In October 1839, as a publicity effort, he presented King Ludwig I of Bavaria with a framed triptych of his work in which this photograph was the right hand image.

This image was labelled as having been taken at "huit heures du matin" (at eight o'clock in the morning) and a very similar plate was mounted in the left panel marked as "midi" (midday). The triptych was put on display at the Munich Arts Association where it immediately attracted attention, with the Leipzig Pfennig-Magazin saying of the 8:00 AM image that "there appeared to be a man having his boots polished who must have been standing extremely still."

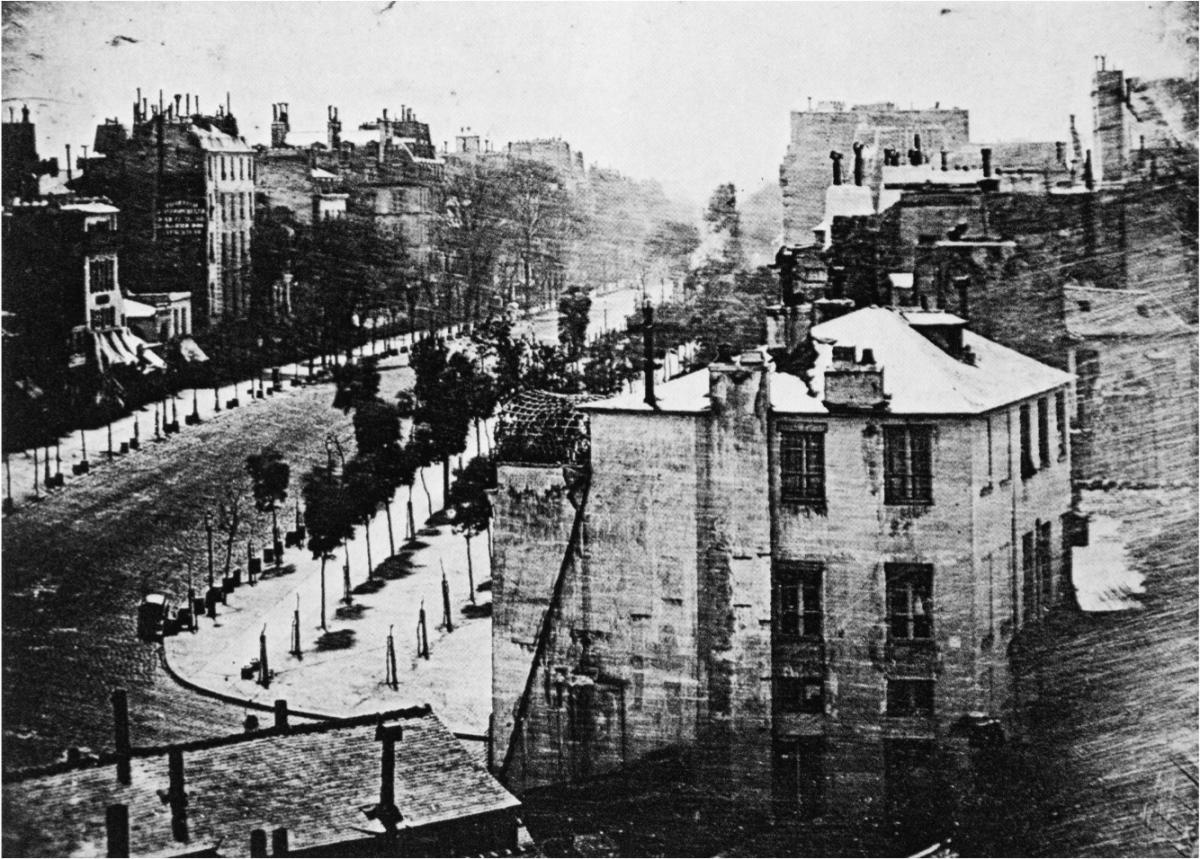
Second image, taken at midday

The images were stored at the royal palace and later at the Bavarian National Museum archives, where they gradually deteriorated until, in 1936 or 1937, the American historian of photography Beaumont Newhall rediscovered them and made reproductions for display in New York. In 1949, he published them in his book The History of Photography from 1839 to the Present Day. During World War II, the original daguerreotypes were kept in poor conditions until, in 1970, they were given out on loan to the Munich City Museum. Restoration was attempted, but ended in disaster, ruining the originals even further. Since then, daguerreotype facsimiles have been reproduced from Newhall's copies.

== Analysis ==
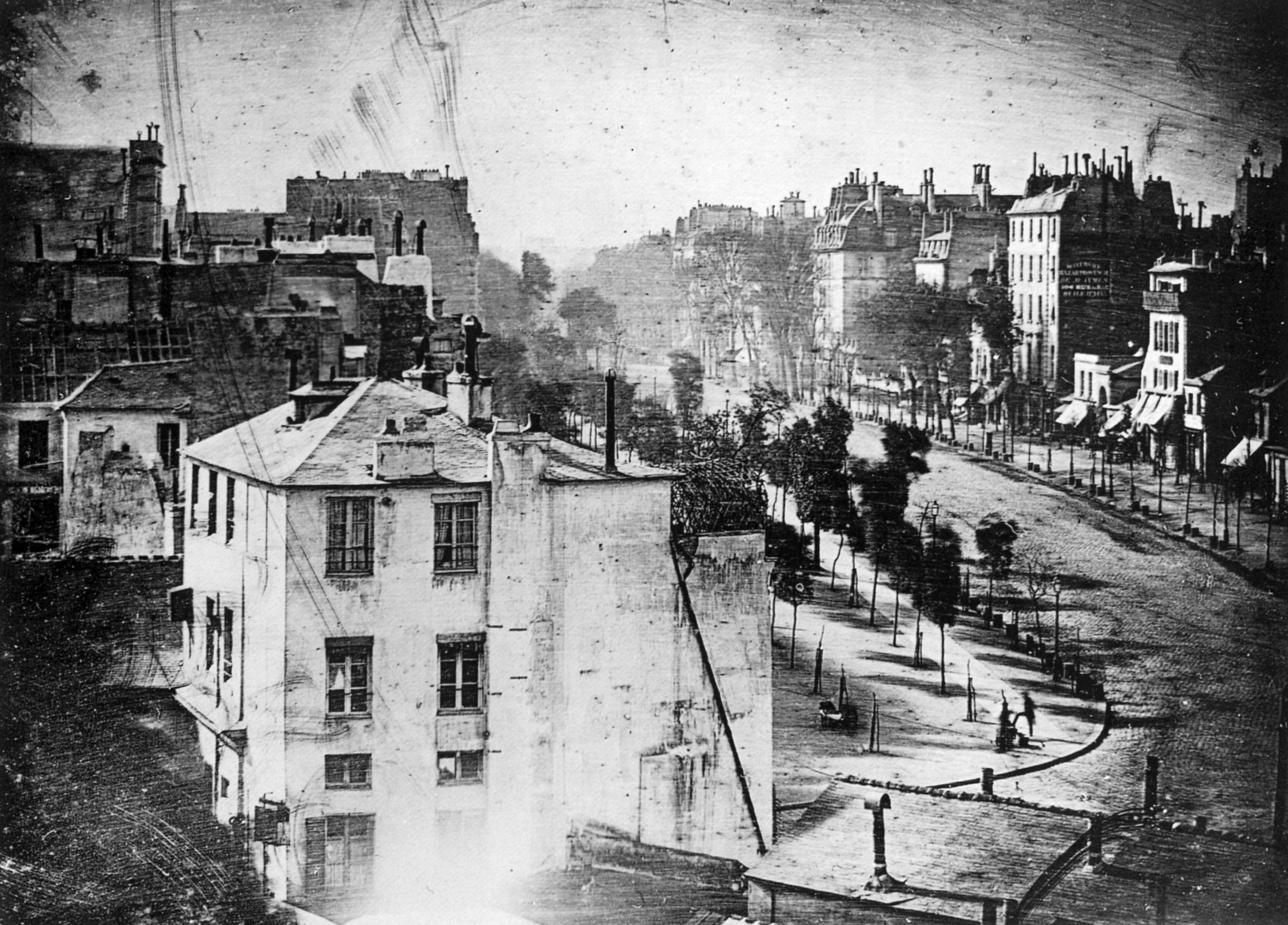
8:00 AM image reversed to show actual orientation

Various people have scrutinised the image to see if there are traces of any other activity. There may be faint images of other people and possibly a child looking out of a window, and a horse.

As with all Daguerre's plates, the picture is a mirror image. Bearing this in mind, the camera location and angle have been analysed.

There may have been photographs of people before 1838. Hippolyte Bayard claimed to have taken photographic self-portraits in 1837, but these have not survived. In an early picture of the Pont Neuf, made by Daguerre possibly as early as 1836, one or two people can be seen lying on the ground. A daguerreotype portrait attributed to Daguerre might date from 1837. The self-portrait by the American Robert Cornelius was taken in 1839.

== Memorial ==
On 15 October 2026, a memorial plaque to the photograph and the two people coincidentally captured on it was unveiled on Place de la République. The plaque made by Brut de Fonte foundry is named « Un détail imprévu » (An unexpected detail) and is located at precisely the location the two people were at in 1838. The location was reconstructed by the three Swedish filmmakers Maximilien Van Aertryck, Axel Danielson and Kalle Boman using analysis of the image's perspective, 3D models and old maps and plans of the area, which was substantially changed during Haussmann's renovation of Paris in the late 1800s.

== See also ==
- History of photography
- History of photographic lens design
- List of photographs considered the most important
