= Théâtre des Élèves pour la Danse de l'Opéra =

Former theatre in Paris, France

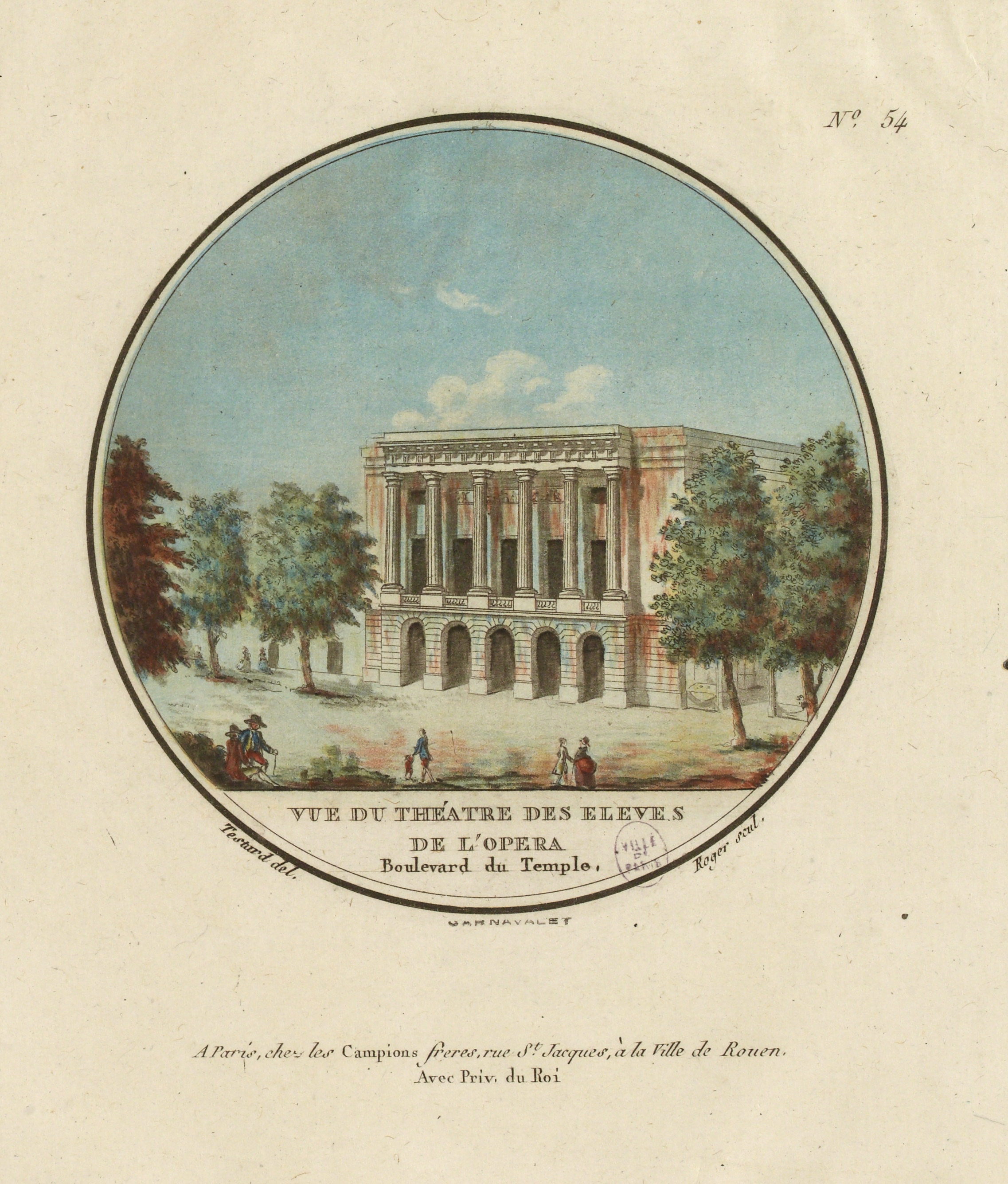
- Interactive map of Théâtre des Élèves pour la Danse de l'Opéra
- Full name: Théâtre des Élèves pour la Danse de l'Opéra
- Address: Boulevard du Temple; Paris; France
- Coordinates: 48.8654°N 2.3657°E
- Event: Opera

Construction
- Built: 1777–1778
- Opened: 1779
- Closed: 1780

Théâtre des Élèves pour la Danse de l'Opéra (French pronunciation: [teɑtʁ dez‿elɛv puʁ la dɑ̃s də lɔpeʁa], lit. 'Theatre of the Students for the Dance of the Opera') was a theatre building in Paris, France.

== History ==
The Théâtre des Élèves pour la Danse de l'Opéra opened at the end of the Boulevard du Temple across from Rue Charlot, built specifically for the L’école de danse de l'Opéra national de Paris.

The company was granted to a man by the name of Texier (or Teissier) who had Abraham, one of the dancers from the Opera, as his partner. In 1777, Mr. Texier, aiming to profit from the students of the Conservatory at the Académie Royale de Musique, began construction of the new theatre. It was built by October 1778. The opening of the theatre was announced for 1 September but was delayed by lack of funds until 7 January 1779.

The premiere performance included 80 students as the actors who began with a pantomime titled Jerusalem Delivered (French: La Jérusalem délivrée), based on Torquato Tasso's Jerusalem Delivered.

The Théâtre des Élèves pour la Danse de l'Opéra ended in bankruptcy, and the students were reintegrated into the Académie Royale de Musique (now Opéra de Paris). The entrepreneurs failed to pay their creditors and actors, leading to a royal order in September 1780 mandating the theatre's closure. The theatre, with a new director, shifted genres and repertoire, reestablishing itself as the Théâtre de Beaujolais.

The theatre was then renamed the Lycée Dramatique, and for a time, plays were performed there. In 1792 the Italian actor Lazari acquired the theatre and renamed it the Variétés Amusantes. His skillful management quickly attracted crowds, and the Variétés Amusantes took the name of its director, Théâtre Lazari. But this success was short-lived. The public was already abandoning the theatre when a fire destroyed it in 1798, and the ruined director committed suicide.
