= Boulevard du Temple =

Boulevard in Paris, France

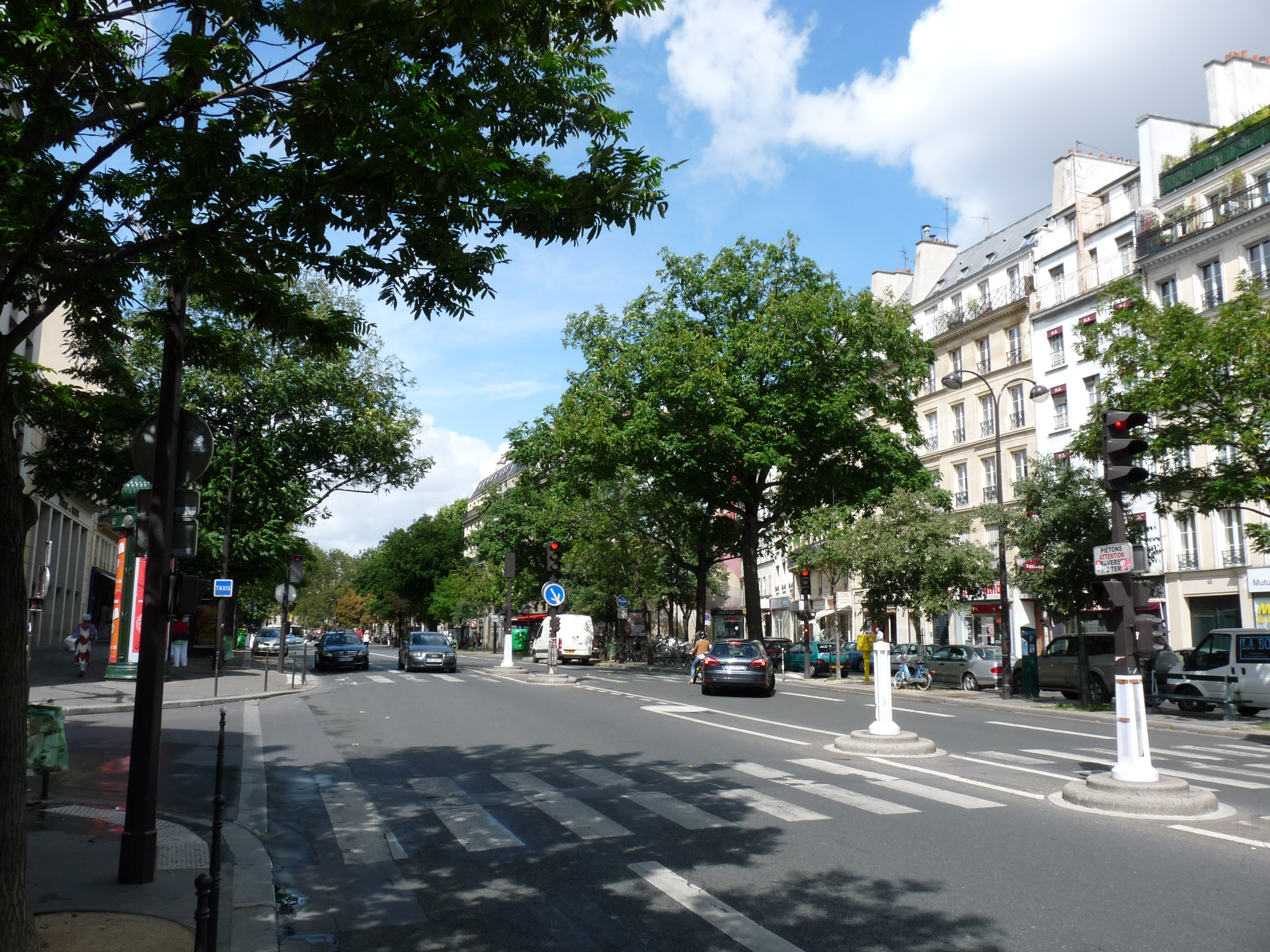

- Location within Paris
- Length: 405 m (1,329 ft)
- Width: 36.5 m (120 ft)
- Arrondissement: 3rd, 11th
- Quarter: Folie-Méricourt Enfants-Rouges
- Coordinates: 48°51′47.84″N 2°21′59.43″E
- From: Place de la République
- To: Place Pasdeloup

Construction
- Completion: 1656
- Denomination: Temple

The Boulevard du Temple (French pronunciation: [bulvaʁ dy tɑ̃pl]), formerly nicknamed the "Boulevard du Crime", is a thoroughfare in Paris that separates the 3rd arrondissement from the 11th. It runs from the Place de la République to the Place Pasdeloup, and its name refers to the nearby Knights Templars' Temple, where they established their Paris priory.

== History ==
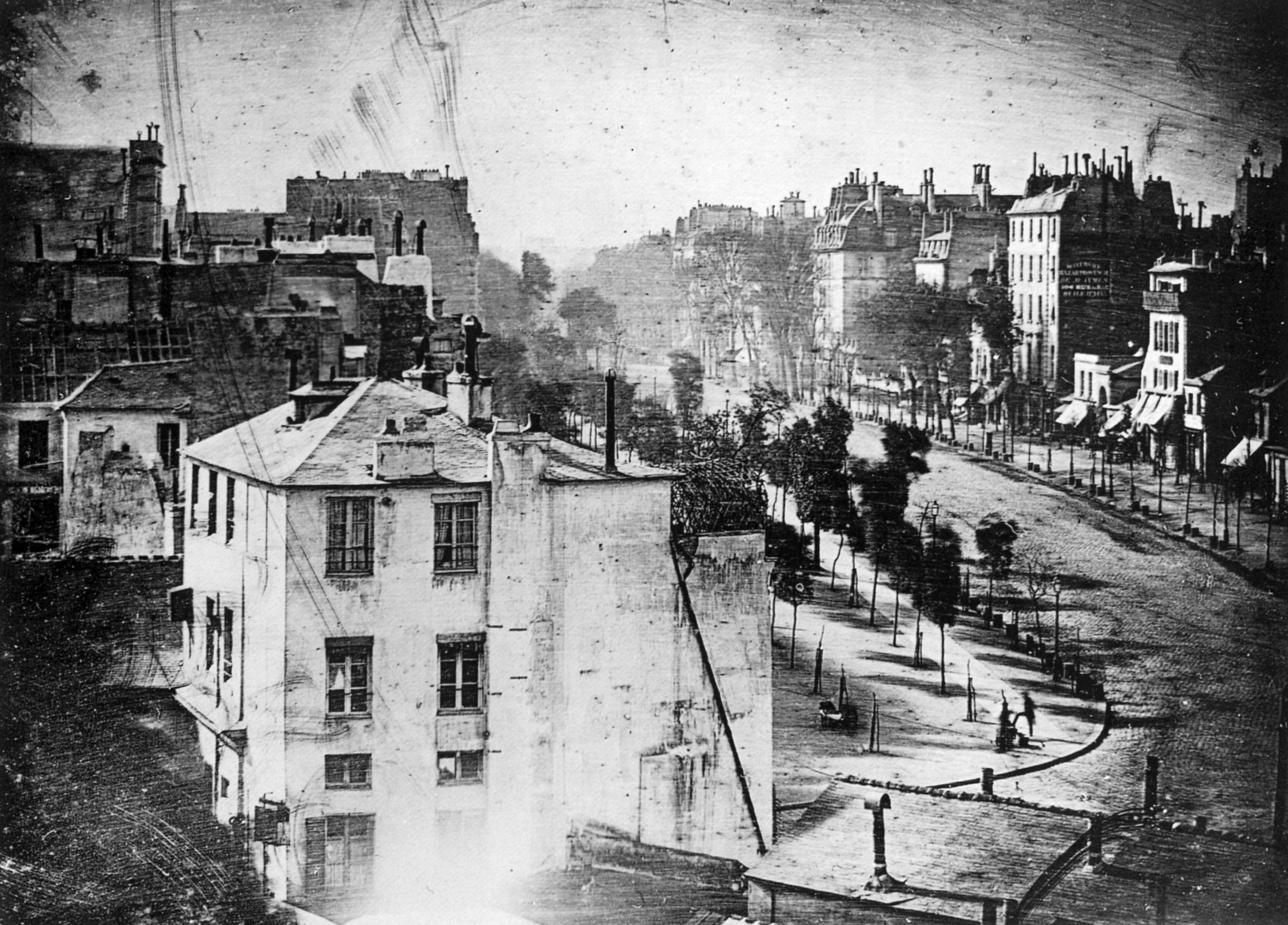
The earliest photograph of the Boulevard du Temple is by Louis Daguerre (1838)

The Boulevard du Temple follows the path of the city wall constructed by Charles V (the so-called Enceinte, constructed between 1356 and 1383) and demolished under Louis XIV. The boulevard, lined with trees, was built between 1656 and 1705.

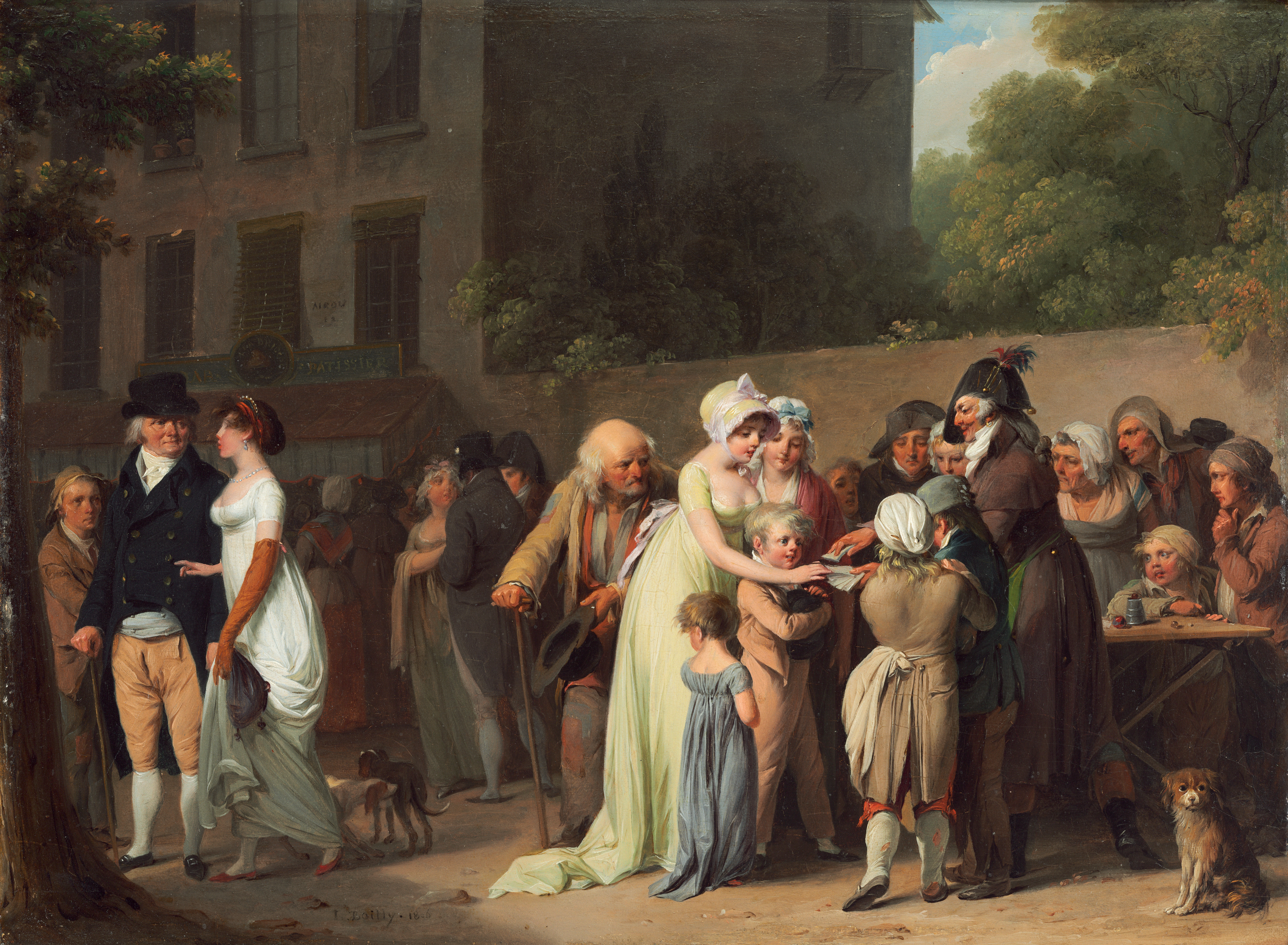
The Card Sharp on the Boulevard by Louis-Léopold Boilly, 1806. The work depicts the Boulevard du Temple in the Napoleonic era.

From the time of Louis XVI (1774–1792) until the July Monarchy in 1830, the Boulevard du Temple was popular and fashionable. It was a place for walking and recreation. Cafés and theatres previously located at the Saint-Laurent and Saint-Germain fairs moved here. After a time, it was nicknamed the Boulevard du Crime after the crime melodramas that were so popular in its many theatres. In 1782, Philippe Curtius, Madame Tussaud's tutor in wax modelling, opened his second exhibition on this boulevard.

On this boulevard, on 28 July 1835, Giuseppe Fieschi made an attempt on the life of the king, Louis-Philippe. The attempt failed, but it resulted in 18 dead and 23 injured. Gustave Flaubert spent several months each winter at 42, boulevard du Temple from 1856 to 1869.

A photograph of this street was taken in 1838 by Louis Daguerre from high in his 350-seat Diorama Building at 4, Rue Sanson, where it intersected with the Rue des Marais, and which from the rear looked out roughly southwards over the rooftops towards the Boulevard du Temple (since demolished, the place where it stood is at the south side of the Rue Léon Jouhaux just off the north corner of the Place de la République). The image is one of the earlier Daguerreotypes (invented 1837), and it is thus believed to be the earliest surviving photograph showing a person. A man stopped to have his shoes shined, and by remaining still, he (though not his head) unwittingly became captured on the plate, while all the other traffic rushing through the street vanished from the image due to the long time of exposure. The exposure of this shot was 4 to 5 minutes.

The transformations of Paris by Baron Haussmann radically modified this part of Le Marais; today, only the Théâtre Déjazet remains of the late 18th century theatres; half of them were demolished for the enlargement of the Place de la République.

== Theatres ==
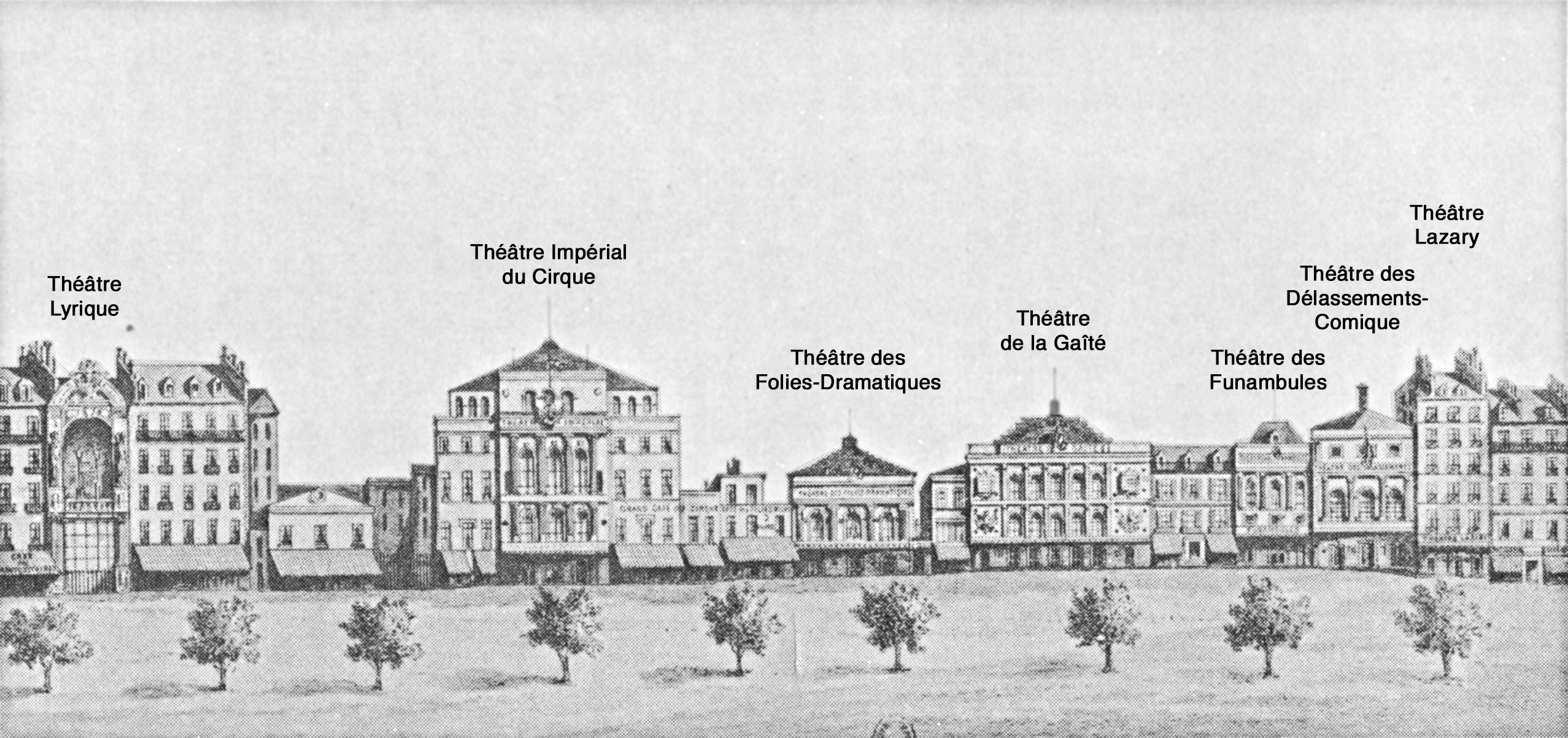
The theatres of the Boulevard du Temple (ca. 1862)

The history of the names of the theatres at various sites on the boulevard du Temple is summarized in the following list. Unless otherwise noted the names and dates are from Lecomte, and the street addresses are based on the 1861 Paris guide of Lehaguez.

- 1759: Théâtre de Nicolet, ou des Grands Danseurs
  - moved across the street to 58 boulevard du Temple in 1764
  - Grands-Danseurs du Roi (acquired this name in 1772)
  - Théâtre de la Gaîté (acquired this name in 1792)
  - rebuilt in 1808 and 1835 after a fire
  - The company relocated to the Rue Papin in 1862.
  - The building on the Boulevard du Temple was demolished sometime thereafter.
- 1769: Théâtre de l'Ambigu-Comique of Nicolas-Médard Audinot
  - located at 62 boulevard du Temple
  - destroyed by fire in 1827 (relocated to 2 boulevard Saint-Martin)
  - replaced by the Théâtre des Folies-Dramatiques (1st, 1831)
  - expropriated in 1862
- 1774: Théâtre des Associés
  - located at 52 boulevard du Temple
  - Théâtre Amusements-Comiques (1787)
  - Théâtre Patriotique (1790)
  - Théâtre Sans-Prétention (1797)
  - Closed in 1807 by Napoleon's decree on the theatres, it became the Café d'Apollon.
  - Théâtre de Madame Saqui (1816)
  - Théâtre du Temple (1832, a vaudeville house run by Roux, dit Dorsay)
  - Théâtre des Délassements-Comiques (3rd, 1841, this company relocated to the Rue de Provence in 1862)
  - Théâtre du boulevard du Temple (1862, for two weeks in July, relocated to the Théâtre Lyrique, reopening with the name Théâtre Historique)
  - The building on this site was later demolished.
- 1779: Théâtre des Élèves pour la Danse de l'Opéra
  - probably located at 48 boulevard du Temple
  - Lycée-Dramatique (1791)
  - Théâtre Lazzari (1st, 1792, also spelled Lazari or Lazary)
  - Théâtre Français du boulevard (1793)
  - Théâtre des Variétés-Amusantes (2nd, 1793)
  - destroyed by fire in 1798
- 1785: Théâtre des Délassements-Comiques (1st), of Plancher ('Aristide Valcour')
  - located between the Hôtel Foulon [site of the later Théâtre Historique] and the site of the later Cirque-Olympique
  - Théâtre Lyri-Comique (1800)
  - Théâtre des Variétés-Amusantes (3rd, 1803)
  - Nouveaux Troubadours (1805)
  - Closed in 1807 by Napoleon's decree on the theatres, most of the building was demolished except for the entry hall, which continued to be used for exhibiting trained dogs and monkeys performing tricks.
- 1787: Théâtre des Bluettes comiques et lyriques
  - Théâtre des Élèves de Thalie (1791)
- 1787: Cabinet des figures de cire (Cabinet of wax figures), disappeared in 1847
- 1813: Théâtre des Funambules (1st)
  - located at 54 boulevard du Temple
  - The company relocated to the Boulevard de Strasbourg in 1862, closing after one year.
  - The building on the Boulevard du Temple was demolished on 18 July 1862.
- 1821: Théâtre Lazzari (2nd)
  - located at 50 boulevard du Temple
  - Spectacle Lazzari
  - Théâtre de Petit-Lazzari
  - Théâtre Lazzari (also spelled Lazary, demolished sometime after 1862)
- 1821: Panorama-Dramatique
  - located at 48 boulevard du Temple
  - The theatre closed after 21 August 1823 and was replaced with a six-story residential building.
- 1827: Cirque-Olympique (3rd)
  - located at 66 boulevard du Temple
  - Opéra-National (1st, 1847, this company reopened at the Théâtre Historique in 1851)
  - Théâtre National du Cirque (1848)
  - Théâtre Impérial du Cirque (1853, relocated to the theatre on the Place du Châtelet in 1862)
  - The building on this site was later demolished.
- 1846: Théâtre Historique (1st)
  - located at 72 boulevard du Temple
  - Opéra-National (2nd, 1851)
  - Théâtre Lyrique (1st, 1852)
  - Théâtre Historique (2nd, 1862, name revived by the Théâtre du boulevard du Temple)
  - This building was demolished in 1863.
- 1853: Théâtre des Folies-Concertantes
  - located at 41 boulevard du Temple, on the site of the former concert-bal, the Folies-Mayer
  - Théâtre des Folies-Nouvelles (1854)
  - Théâtre Déjazet (1859)
  - Théâtre des Folies-Nouvelles (1872)
  - Théâtre Déjazet (1873)
  - Troisième Théâtre Français (1876)
  - Théâtre des Folies-Nouvelles (1880)
  - Théâtre Déjazet (1880–)

== Metro stations ==
The Boulevard du Temple is:

Located near the Metro station: République.

It is also

Located near the Metro station: Filles du Calvaire.

It is served by lines 3, 5, 8, 9, and 11.
