= Théâtre Historique =

Former theatre in Paris

- Théâtre Historique (1847–1850); Opéra National (1851–1852); Théâtre Lyrique (1852–1862); Théâtre Historique (1862)
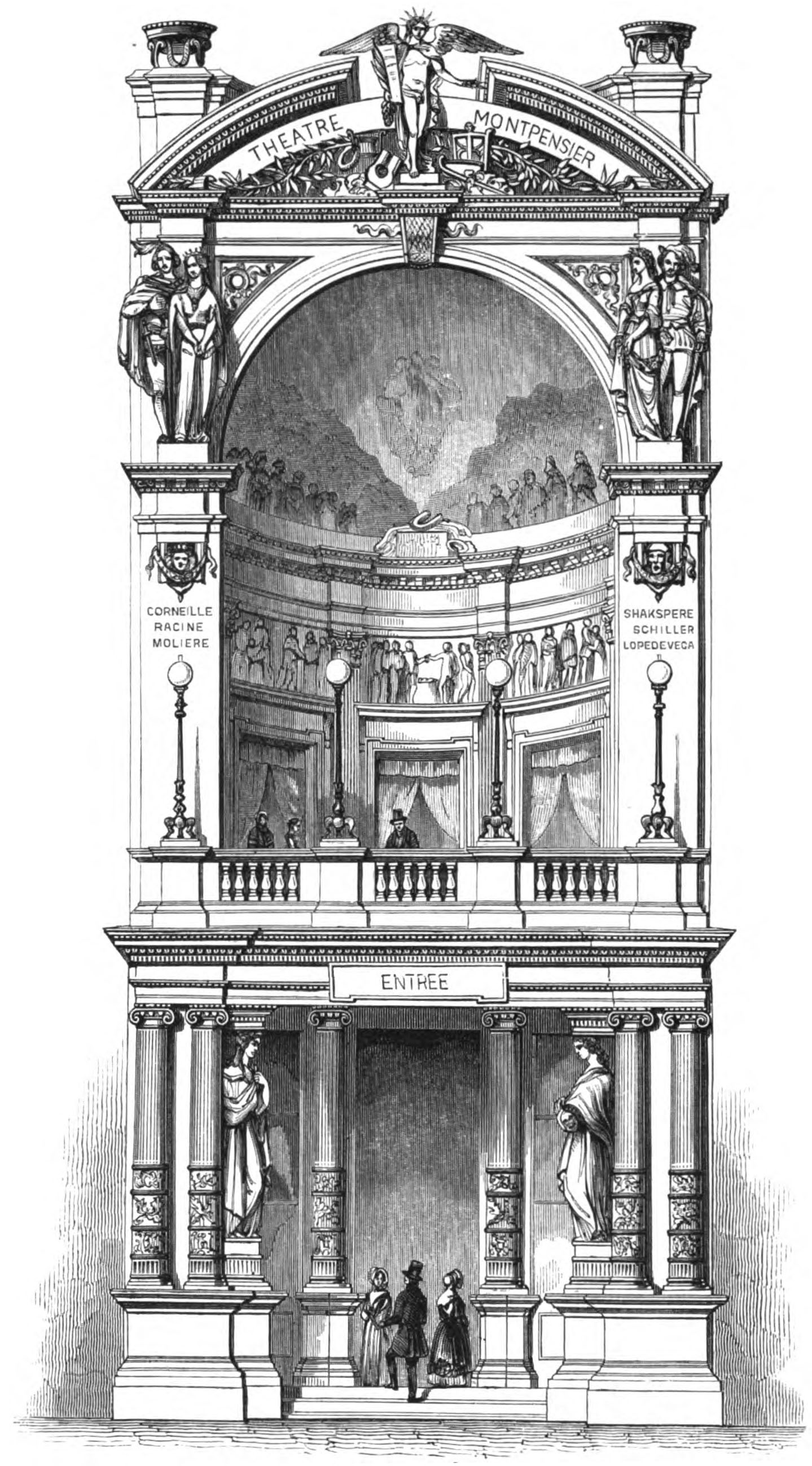
- Design for the facade of the Théâtre Historique (1846)
- Interactive map of Théâtre Historique
- Address: 72 boulevard du Temple, 9th arrondissement Paris; France
- Coordinates: 48°52′02″N 2°21′53″E
- Capacity: 2,000

Construction
- Opened: 20 February 1847
- Demolished: 1863
- Architect: Pierre-Anne Dedreux (1788–1849)

The Théâtre Historique (French pronunciation: [teɑtʁ istɔʁik]), a former Parisian theatre located on the boulevard du Temple, was built in 1846 for the French novelist and dramatist Alexandre Dumas. Plays adapted by Dumas from his historical novels were mostly performed, and, although the theatre survived the 1848 Revolution, it suffered increasing financial difficulty and closed at the end of 1850. In September 1851 the building was taken over by the Opéra National and renamed again in 1852 to Théâtre Lyrique. In 1863, during Haussmann's renovation of Paris, it was demolished to make way for the Place de la République. The name Théâtre Historique was revived by some other companies in the late 1870s and early 1890s.

== Founding ==
Dumas tells the story behind the founding of the Théâtre Historique in his 1867 memoir Histoire de mes bêtes. His drama adapted from his novel The Three Musketeers had premiered on 27 October 1845 on the boulevard du Temple at the Théâtre de l'Ambigu-Comique. On that occasion Dumas met the 21-year-old Duke of Montpensier, youngest son of the French king, Louis-Philippe. The Duke invited Dumas to his box at the end of the performance, and during their conversation, he offered to use his influence to help Dumas obtain a license to open a theatre. The Duke first approached the Minister of the Interior, Tanneguy Duchâtel, who declined saying that Paris already had enough theatres. The Duke then went directly to his father.

By 14 March 1846 the privilège was assigned to Hippolyte Hostein (former stage manager of the Ambigu-Comique), who had been designated by Dumas as the director of the new theatre. The license granted the right to present prose dramas and comedies, as well as lyric choral works for two months of each year. A company was formed on 24 March composed of Dumas, M. Védel (pseudonym of Alexandre Poulet, former director of the Comédie-Française), the banker Auguste-Armand Bourgoin (son of a celebrated actress), M. Ardoin (principal proprietor of the Passage Jouffroy), and Hostein. Within a month the company purchased two sites on the boulevard du Temple, near its intersection with the rue du Faubourg du Temple: the former Hôtel Foulon and a small café-bar, the Epi-Scié, next to the Cirque Olympique. Together, the two sites cost about 600,000 francs. Work began almost immediately under the direction of the architect Pierre-Anne Dedreux and the architectural (and stage set) decorator-painter Charles Séchan.

== Building design ==
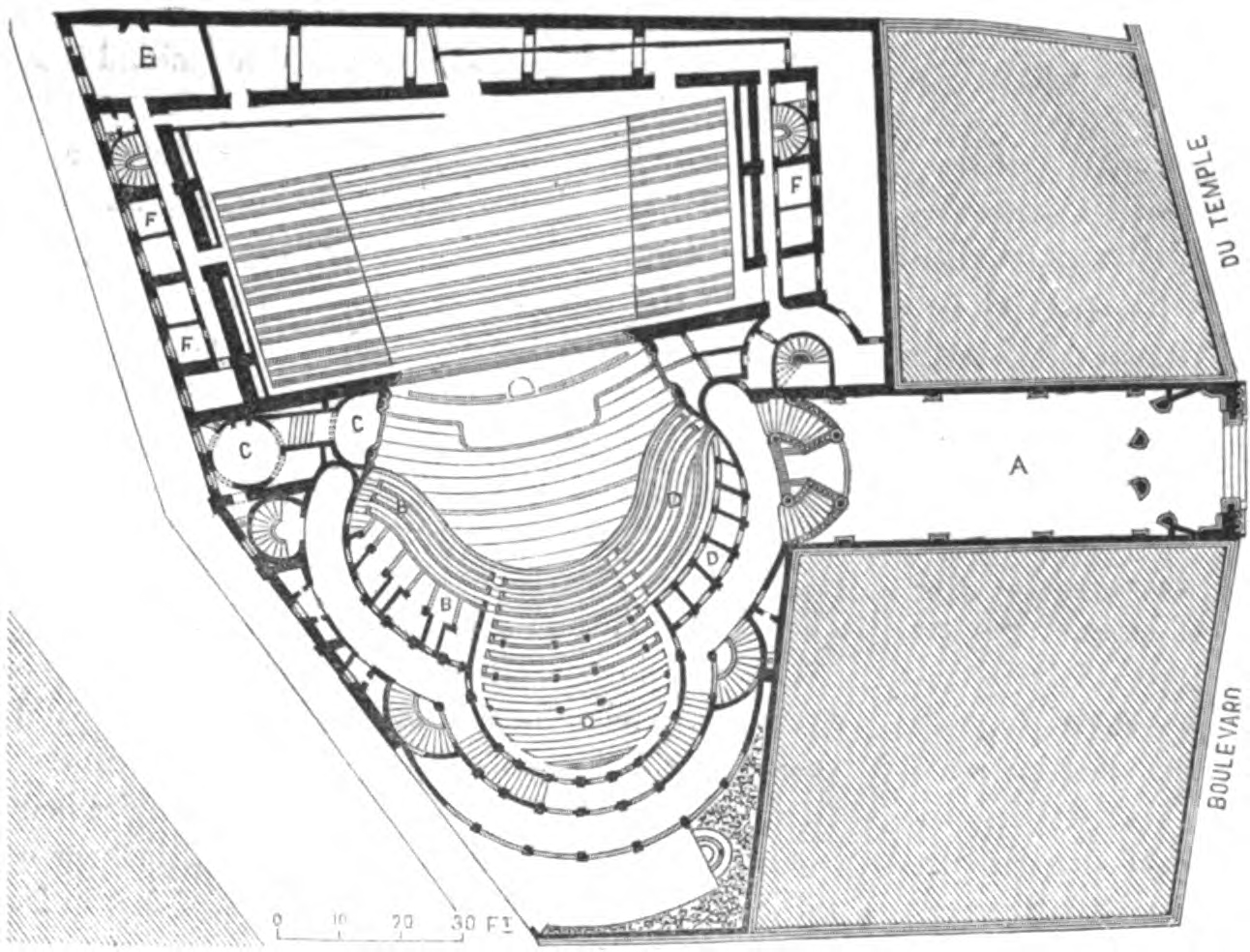
Plan of the Théâtre Historique

The awkward site, wedged between two buildings at the front, and wide at the back on the rue des Fossés du Temple, "required great skill in adapting it to its new purpose." The facade on the boulevard du Temple was unusually tall and narrow, not more than 26 feet (7.9 m) in width. The entrance was flanked by two pairs of engaged fluted Ionic columns on a high base with two broad sculptured bands on the lower portion of each column. Two facing caryatides, presenting in profile to the boulevard and representing the muses of Tragedy and Comedy, supported the flat architrave at the front of a semicircular entryway with four equally spaced Ionic columns delimiting the curvature of the inside doorway.

Above the entablature of the entrance was an unusual semicircular Corinthian balcony enclosed at the front by a thin balustrade surmounted with four lampposts. At the top of the two double-width flat pilasters bracketing the balcony were masks of Tragedy and Comedy, below which were engraved the names of six playwrights: on the left, Corneille, Racine, and Molière; and on the right, Shakspere (in 19th-century spelling), Schiller, and Lope de Vega. The balcony was covered with a semidome above a semicircular frieze. Both the cupola and the frieze were painted in fresco by Joseph Guichard. The central group of figures in the cupola represented Poetry, leading Comedy by the hand, and Tragedy, each carrying their respective attributes, the comic mask and the poniard. Below these to the right were Aeschylus, Sophocles, Euripides, Seneca, Shakespeare, Corneille, Racine, Voltaire, Schiller, Talma, Nourrit, Gluck, and Méhul, and to the left, Aristophanes, Menander, Plautus, Terence, Molière, Goethe, Lope de Vega, Cervantes, Regnard, Marivaux, Mlle Mars, Mozart, and Grétry. The panels in the frieze portrayed the Temple of Bacchus and scenes from Medea, Phèdre, Othello, Cinna, Le Misanthrope, Le Bourgeois gentilhomme, Faust, Mahomet, William Tell, and L'Avare. Flanking the semidome on the front were pairs of figures representing on the left, Corneille's Cid and Chimène, and on the right, Shakespeare's Hamlet and Ophelia. The central figure in the break in the circular pediment represented the "Genius of Modern Art". All of the sculpture was the work of Jean-Baptiste-Jules Klagmann, also known for his sculpture work at the Fontaine Louvois.

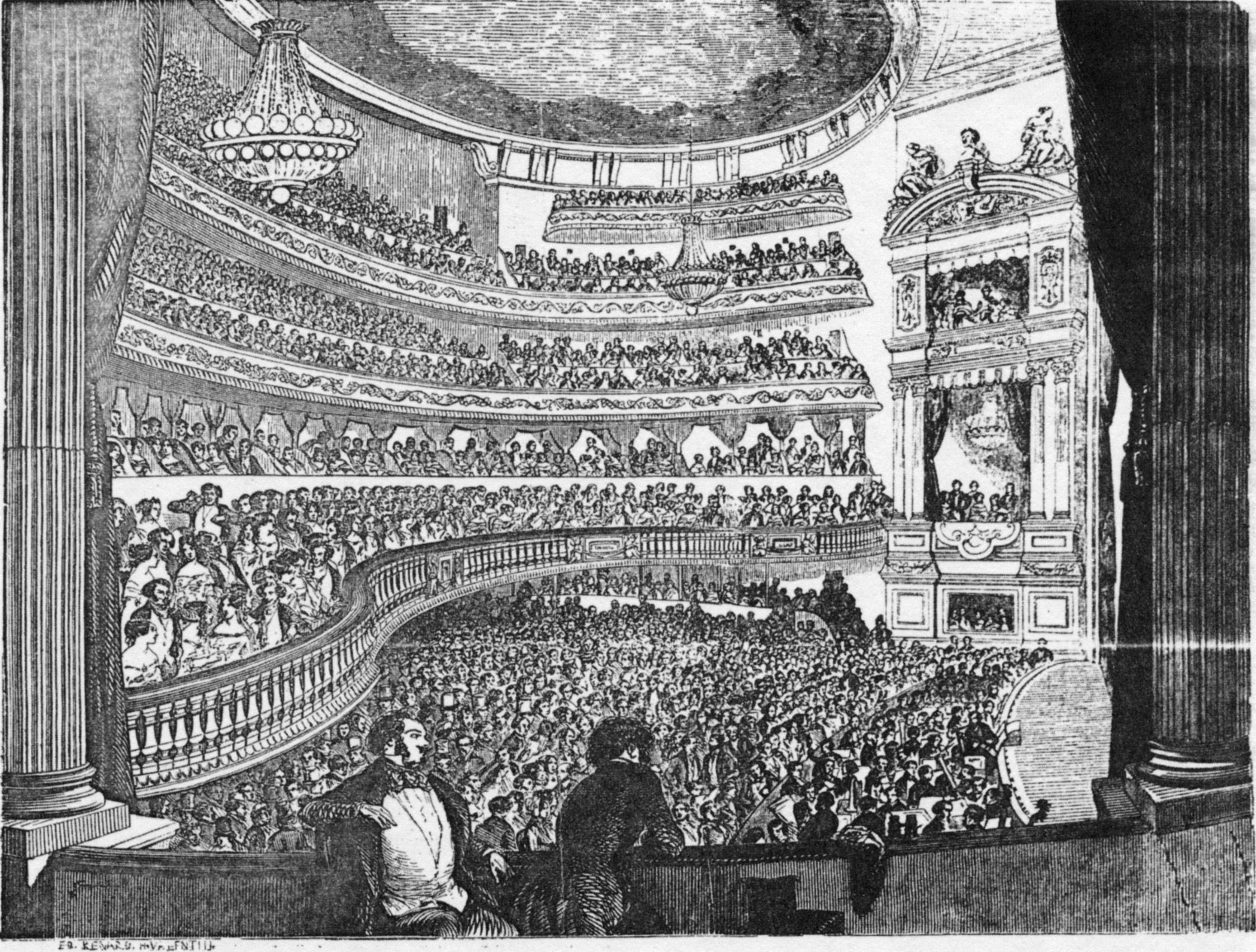
View of the auditorium from the a stage box showing the two chandeliers

The entrance vestibule (marked A in the plan) was as narrow as the facade, only 60 feet (18 m) long and 14 feet (4.3 m) high. A foyer, located on the floor above the vestibule, provided access to the exterior balcony and was "surprisingly warm" with tones of white-gold enhanced with the dark red of the velvet coverings of the divans and chairs, and light from elaborate chandeliers of a "fantastic and capricious design."

The shape of the auditorium was quite different from most Parisian theatres of the time, being an ellipse the long axis of which was aligned parallel to the stage rather than perpendicular to it. This arrangement was reminiscent of Pallidio's 16th-century theatre, the Teatro Olimpico, in Vicenza. The long axis, from the back of the boxes on one side to the other, was 65 feet (20 m) in length, while the short axis was 52 feet (16 m). The exceptional width of the opening to the stage, at 36 feet (11 m), was considered advantageous to the presentation of spectacle, while the shape of the house favored excellent sight lines and good acoustics, since it brought most of the spectators closer to the stage.

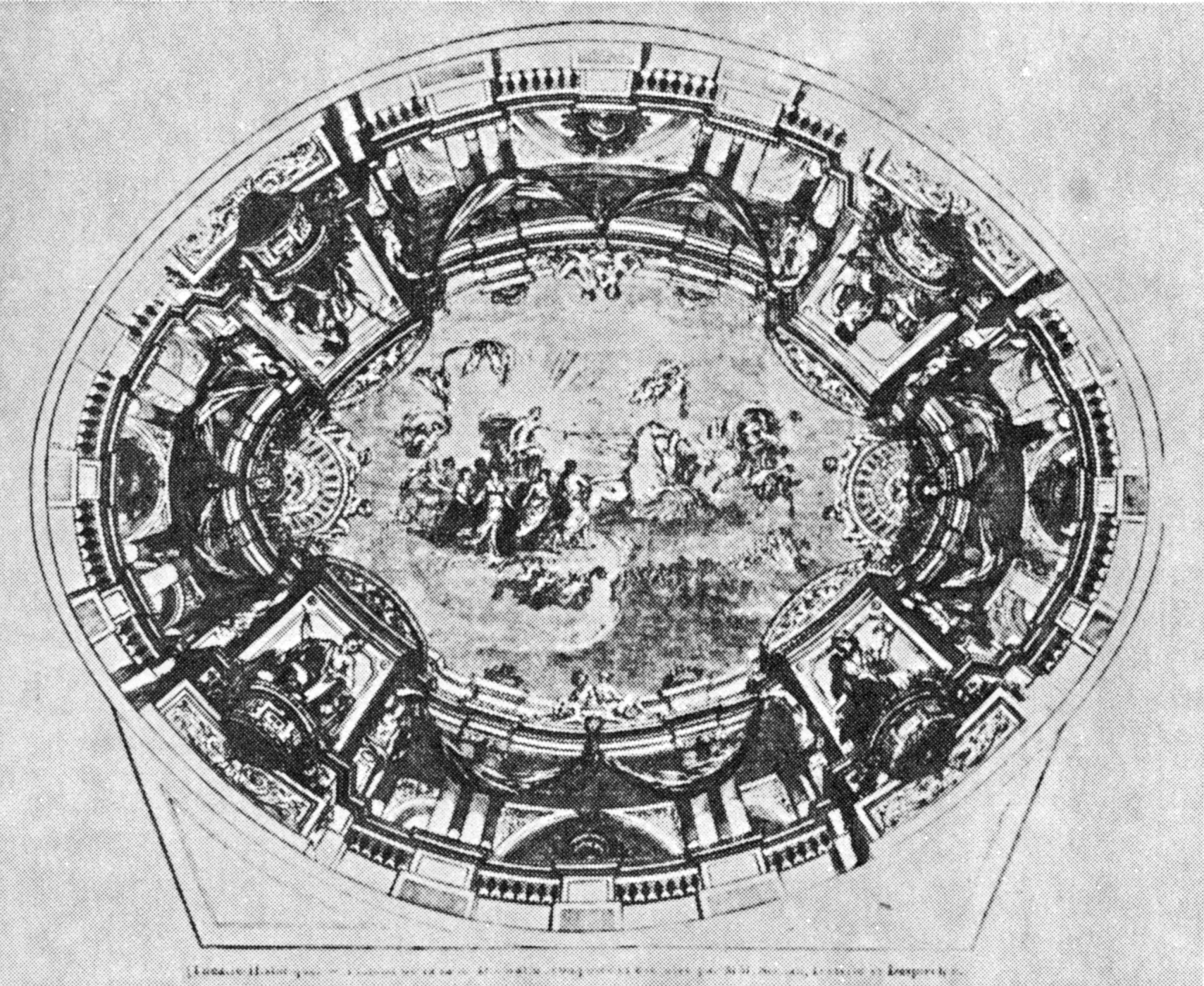
The ceiling of the Théâtre Historique

The striking oval ceiling was designed and painted by Charles Séchan, Jules Diéterle and Édouard Desplechin. The scene in the center depicted Apollo on his chariot pulled by four horses, followed by Aurora, the Hours, the Muses, and Arts and Sciences, among others. Two chandeliers were suspended at opposite ends of this central oval, which was unlike most other Parisian theatres, where typically a single chandelier hung from the center of the ceiling and sometimes obstructed views of the stage from the galleries. Surrounding the scene with Apollo were painted in perspective a balustrade topped by a colonnade of double Corinthian columns. The colonnade was interrupted at the midpoints between the vertices by four thrones occupied by the muses of Painting, Comedy, Music, and Tragedy.

The theatre was designed to accommodate two divergent types of audience, that of the working class common to the boulevard du Temple and that of the most brilliant society of Paris, on whom the directors of the theatre depended as their patrons. "What was desired, therefore, was a building so arranged that the élite of Parisian society might find every provision for their comfort without in any way trenching upon that of the ordinary public of the theatres of the Boulevard."

Three large balconies were flanked either side by Corinthian pavilions with two levels of stage boxes crowned with highly ornamented circular pediments. The lower box on the left (C in the plan) was especially luxurious and was originally intended for the use of the Duke of Montpensier. It was connected by a short passageway to an adjoining circular salon (also C). The first tier was fronted with a balustrade and included dress-circle seating (B) in front of rows of boxes, each with its own small private sitting room behind it. Two large amphitheatres (one of which is marked D) extended back from the second and third tier balconies, providing a large number of less expensive seats. Finally, above the third tier, were two small lateral balconies, sometimes referred to as the gods. The capacity of the house was said to be about 2,000.

== Name ==
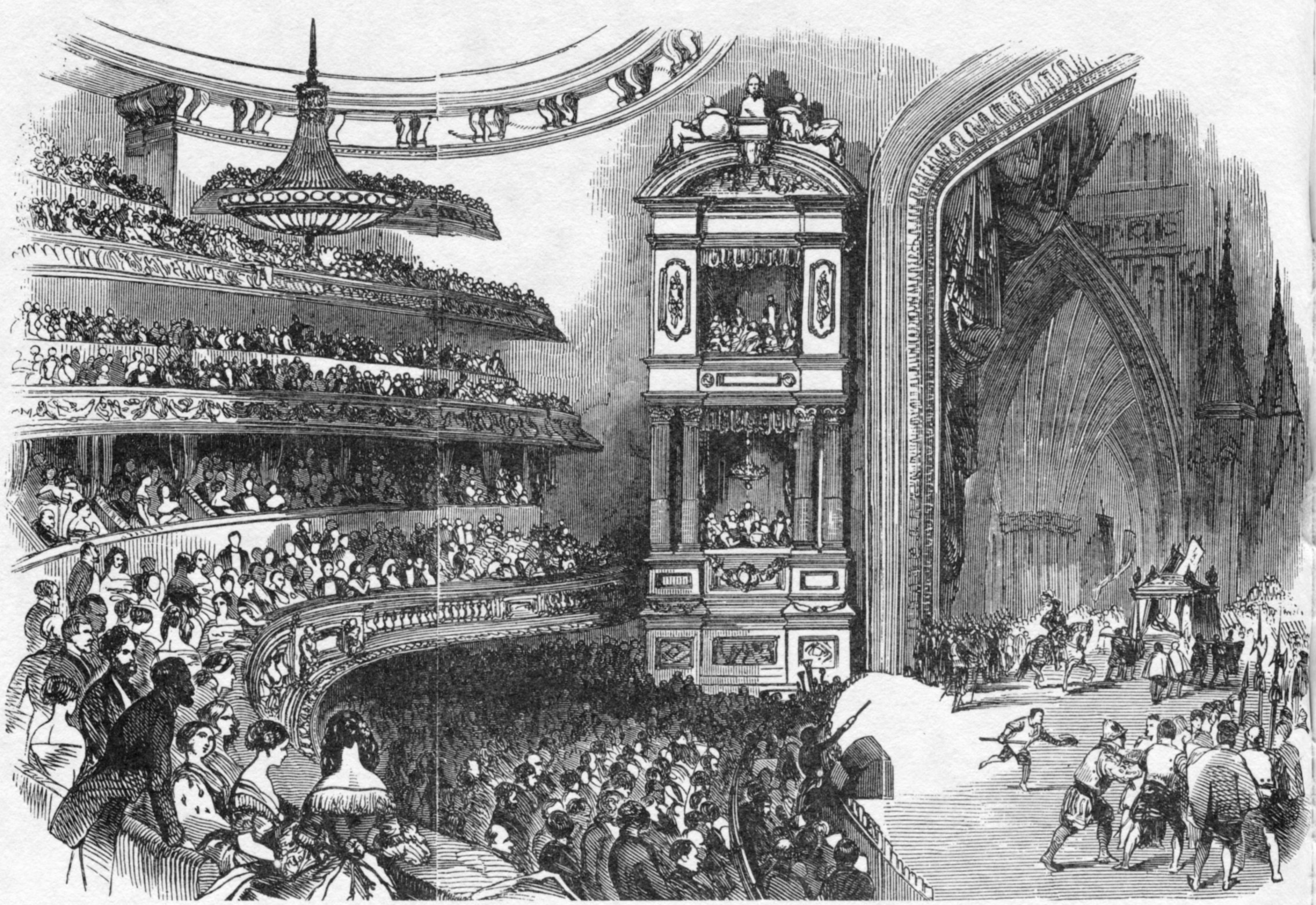
View of the interior during the opening performance

Originally the theatre was supposed to be named after its primary patron, the Duke of Montpensier, but his father Louis-Philippe did not think it proper that a theatre should be named after his son. Dumas proposed Théâtre Européen as an alternative, but this triggered dissension among the other parties involved, and it was eventually decided that the name would be disrespectful of the Théâtre Français. Védel finally proposed Théâtre Historique, which was considered particularly appropriate as the repertory was to consist mainly of dramatizations of Dumas's historical romances. This name was ratified by the government minister on 23 December 1846.

By this time Dumas had already departed on a trip to Spain, to attend the wedding of the Duke of Montpensier to the Queen of Spain's fourteen-year-old sister, Luisa Fernanda, on 10 October, and then to North Africa, to gather material for writing a travel book intended to advertise the newly acquired French colonies in that region (a project that had been initiated by the Minister of Education, Narcisse Achille de Salvandy). This left Hostein to assemble a company and begin preparations for the first productions, and when Dumas returned in January, these were already well underway.

== Opening ==
The opening, on 20 February 1847 with Dumas's play adapted from his novel La Reine Margot, was an eagerly awaited event, and the duke and his new bride were also expected to attend. The audience for the galleries began forming queues 24 hours ahead, even though it was the middle of winter. It helped, however, there were soup-sellers and bakers with bread hot from the ovens, and bundles of straw which could be purchased by those who wished to lie down.

== List of premieres ==
Date	Title	Genre	Subdivisions	Author(s)
20 February 1847	La reine Margot (after Dumas' novel)	drama	5 acts	Alexandre Dumas, Auguste Maquet
11 June 1847	Intrigue et Amour (after Schiller's play)	drama	5 acts	Alexandre Dumas
3 August 1847	Le chevalier de Maison Rouge	drama	5 acts	Alexandre Dumas, Auguste Maquet
15 December 1847	Hamlet, prince de Danemark (after Shakespeare's play)	verse drama	5 acts	Alexandre Dumas, Paul Meurice
3 February 1848	Monte-Cristo I (after Dumas' novel)	drama	5 acts	Alexandre Dumas, Auguste Maquet
4 February 1848	Monte-Cristo II (after Dumas' novel)	drama	5 acts	Alexandre Dumas, Auguste Maquet
25 May 1848	La marâtre	drama	5 acts	Honoré de Balzac
10 August 1848	Le chandelier	comedy	3 acts	Alfred de Musset
14 October 1848	Catalina	drama	5 acts	Alexandre Dumas, Auguste Maquet
17 February 1849	La jeunesse de mousquetaires (after Dumas' novel)	drama	5 acts and epilogue	Alexandre Dumas, Auguste Maquet
26 July 1849	Le chevalier d'Harmental	drama	prologue and 5 acts	Alexandre Dumas, Auguste Maquet
1 October 1849	La guerre des femmes	drama	5 acts	Alexandre Dumas, Auguste Maquet
22 November 1849	Le comte Hermann	drama	5 acts and epilogue	Alexandre Dumas
30 March 1850	Urbain Grandier	drama	prologue and 5 acts	Alexandre Dumas, Auguste Maquet
1 June 1850	Pauline	drama	5 acts	Alexandre Dumas, Eugène Grangé, Xavier de Montépin
3 August 1850	La chasse au chastre	fantasy	3 acts	Alexandre Dumas, Auguste Maquet
August 1850	Les frères corse (after Dumas' novel)	drama	5 acts	Alexandre Dumas, Eugène Grangé, Xavier de Montépin

== See also ==
- List of former or demolished entertainment venues in Paris

== Bibliography ==
- Chauveau, Philippe (1999). Les théâtres parisiens disparus, 1402–1986. Paris: Amandier. ISBN 9782907649308.
- Dickinson, Linzy Erika (2000). Theatre in Balzac's 'La Comédie humaine'. Amsterdam: Rodopi. ISBN 9789042005495.
- Dumas, Alexandre (1867). Histoire de mes bêtes. Paris: Michel Lévy frères. View at Google Books.
- Galignani's New Paris Guide (1848). Paris: A. and W. Galignani. View at Google Books.
- Galignani's New Paris Guide for 1859. Paris: A. and W. Galignani. View at Google Books.
- Garreau, Joseph E. (1984). "Dumas, Alexandre, père" in Hochman 1984, vol. 2, pp. 51–55.
- Gautier, Théophile (1859). Histoire de l'art dramatique en France depuis vingt-cinq ans (5^{e} série). Paris: Hetzel. View at Google Books.
- Godwin, George (1850). Buildings & Monuments, Modern and Medieval. London: The Builder. View at Google Books.
- Hastings, Walter Scott (1917). The Drama of Honoré de Balzac (dissertation). Baltimore: Johns Hopkins University. View at Google Books.
- Hemmings, F. W. J. (1979). Alexandre Dumas: The King of Romance. New York: Charles Scribner's Sons. ISBN 9780684163918.
- Hochman, Stanley, editor (1984). McGraw-Hill Encyclopedia of World Drama. New York: McGraw-Hill. ISBN 9780070791695.
- Hostein, Hippolyte (1878). Historiettes et souvenirs d'un homme de théâtre. Paris: Dentu. View at Google Books.
- Lecomte, Louis-Henry (1906). Histoire des théâtres de Paris: Le Théâtre historique, 1847–1851 — 1862 — 1879–1879 — 1890–1891. Paris: H. Daragon. View at Google Books.
- McCormick, John (1993). Popular Theatres of Nineteenth Century France. New York: Routledge. ISBN 9780415088541.
- Pougin, Arthur (1889). "Le Théâtre Historique d'Alexandre Dumas" in La revue d'art dramatique OCLC 173379009, vol. 13, no. 77 (1 March 1889), pp. 257–274. View at Google Books.
- Schopp, Claude (1988). Alexandre Dumas: Genius of Life, translated by A.J. Koch. New York: Franklin Watts. ISBN 9780531150931.
- Walsh, T. J. (1981). Second Empire Opera: The Théâtre Lyrique Paris 1851–1870. New York: Riverrun Press. ISBN 9780714536590.
- Wild, Nicole ([1989]). Dictionnaire des théâtres parisiens au XIXe siècle: les théâtres et la musique. Paris: Aux Amateurs de livres. ISBN 9780828825863. ISBN 9782905053800 (paperback). View formats and editions at WorldCat.
