= Thomas Joseph Walsh (Wexford) =

Irish opera director

Thomas Joseph Walsh (20 November 1911 – 8 November 1988) was an Irish doctor, writer, and founder and director of the Wexford Opera Festival.

== Life ==
Walsh was born in Wexford, Ireland, and graduated in medicine from University College Dublin in 1944. During his years in Dublin he took singing lessons from Adelio Viani at the Royal Irish Academy of Music. In 1972, he completed a Ph.D. at Trinity College, Dublin, the thesis becoming the basis for his 1973 book on Opera in Dublin.

He became chairman and artistic director of the Wexford Festival in 1951 and established its international recognition over 15 years while still working as an anaesthetist at Wexford County Hospital. Known locally as "Doctor Tom" he "inspired great affection, admiration, and, given his great learning, even a measure of awe".

== Writings ==
Walsh wrote several books relating to opera, covering 18th century Dublin, opera in Monte Carlo and the Théâtre Lyrique in Paris:

- Opera in Old Dublin, 1819–1838 (Wexford: The Free Press, 1952)
- Opera in Dublin, 1705–1797: the Social Scene (Dublin: Allen Figgis, 1973)
- Monte Carlo Opera, 1879–1909 (Dublin: Gill and Macmillan, 1975). ISBN 978-0-7171-0725-4
- Second Empire Opera: The Théâtre Lyrique Paris 1851–1870 (London: John Calder & New York: Riverrun Press, 1981). ISBN 0-7145-3659-8
- Opera in Dublin, 1798–1820: Frederick Jones and the Crow Street Theatre (Oxford: Oxford University Press, 1993). ISBN 0-19-816397-5
