= Decree on the theatres =

On 10 thermidor year 15 (29 July 1807), Napoleon I of France signed a decree reducing the number of theatres in Paris to eight, giving the force of law to a decree of the interior minister of 25 April that same year. This measure cut short an expansion in theatres.

Following is a list of the theatres that remained.

Grands théâtres

- Théâtre Français (Théâtre de S.M. l'Empereur), reserved for tragedy and comedy;
- Théâtre de l'Impératrice, as an annex of the Théâtre Français;
- Théâtre de l'Opéra (Académie impériale de Musique), for song and dance;
- Théâtre de l'Opéra-Comique, for comédies ou drames mêlés de couplets, d'ariettes et de morceaux d'ensemble.

Théâtres secondaires

- Théâtre du Vaudeville, reserved for petites pièces mêlées de couplets sur des airs connus;
- Théâtre des Variétés, for repertoire made up of petites pièces dans le genre grivois, poissard ou villageois;
- Théâtre de la Porte Saint-Martin, for melodrama and spectaculars;
- Théâtre de la Gaîté, for pantomimes de tous genres, mais sans ballets, aux arlequinades et autres farces, dans le goût de celles données autrefois par Nicolet.

The decree did not remain in force after Napoleon's fall in 1814.

== See also ==
- Paris under Napoleon
- Theatre of France
