= Crocodile (disambiguation) =

A crocodile is a large reptile of the family Crocodylidae.

Crocodile(s), The Crocodile(s) or Le Crocodile may also refer to:

== Arts and entertainment ==
=== Fictional characters ===
- Michael "Crocodile" Dundee, film character
- Crocodile (One Piece), a character in manga and anime series One Piece
- Mr. Gold ("the Crocodile"), a character in US TV series Once Upon a Time

=== Films ===
- Crocodile (1980 film), a Thai film directed by Sompote Sands
- Crocodile (1996 film), a Korean film directed by Kim Ki-duk
- Crocodile (2000 film), a film directed by Tobe Hooper
- The Crocodile (film), a 2005 Cambodian film
- Le Crocodile (cancelled film), France
- Crocodiles (film), 2025 Mexican film

=== Television ===
- "Crocodile" (Dexter), episode of US TV series
- "The Crocodile" (Once Upon a Time), episode of US TV series
- "Crocodile" (Black Mirror), episode of TV series

=== Literature ===
- "The Crocodile" (short story), by Fyodor Dostoyevsky, 1865
- "Crocodile" (fairy tale), children's fantasy poem by Korney Chukovsky, 1916-1917

== Music ==
- "Ah ! Les crocodiles", a French children's song
- Crocodiles (band), US
- The Crocodiles, a New Zealand pop band
- Crocodiles (album), by Echo & The Bunnymen, 1980
- "Crocodile" (song), by Underworld
- "Crocodile", a song by The Coasters
- "Crocodile", a song by XTC from Nonsuch
- The Crocodile, a music venue in Seattle, Washington, U.S.
- Le Crocodile, an 1886 opera by Jules Massenet and Victorien Sardou
- "Crocodillaz", a song by Gorillaz from the deluxe edition of their album Cracker Island

== In the military ==
- HMS Crocodile, four ships of the Royal Navy
- Churchill Crocodile, a UK WWII flamethrowing tank
- a nickname for the Mil Mi-24, a Soviet attack helicopter
- Crocodile armoured personnel carrier, Rhodesia/Zimbabwe

== Transport ==
- Crocodile (locomotive), electric
- Crocodile (train protection system), or Le Crocodile, used in France, Belgium and Luxembourg
- Crocodile or walking bus, escorted young schoolchildren walking together

== Places ==
- Crocodile River (disambiguation)
- Lake Timsah or Crocodile Lake, in the Nile delta
- Central Island or Crocodile Island, Lake Turkana, Kenya
- Crocodile Islands, Northern Territory, Australia
- Crocodile Creek, near Bouldercombe, Queensland, Australia

== Sports ==
- Cologne Crocodiles, an American football club, Germany
- Coritiba Crocodiles, an American football team, Paraná, Brazil
- Seinajoki Crocodiles, an American football team, Finland
- Townsville Crocodiles, a basketball team, Queensland, Australia
- Crocodile Trophy, a mountain bike race, Queensland, Australia

== People with the nickname ==
- Crocodile (pharaoh), ancient Egyptian protodynastic ruler
- René Lacoste (1904–1996), French tennis player
- Emmerson Mnangagwa, Zimbabwean politician
- Ernest Rutherford (1871–1937), physicist

== Other uses ==
- Crocodile (Carrington), a painting and a sculpture
- Crocodile clip, an electrical connector
- Crocodile Garments
- The Crocodile Club, a group of federalist MEPs

== See also ==
- Au Crocodile, a French restaurant in Strasburg
- Crocodilefish (disambiguation)
- Croco (disambiguation)
- Krokodil (disambiguation)
- Croc (disambiguation)
