= Cockade of France =

National ornament

Cockade of France

The cockade of France (French: Cocarde tricolore, lit. 'Tricolor cockade') is the national ornament of France, obtained by circularly pleating a blue, white and red ribbon. It is composed of the three colors of the French flag, with blue in the center, white immediately outside and red on the edge.

== History ==
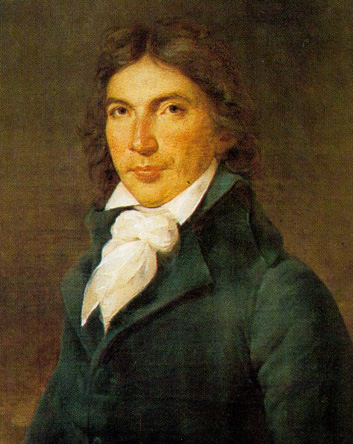
Camille Desmoulins, who devised the first French cockade

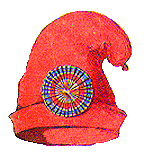
The Phrygian cap with a French tricolor cockade, symbols of the Revolution

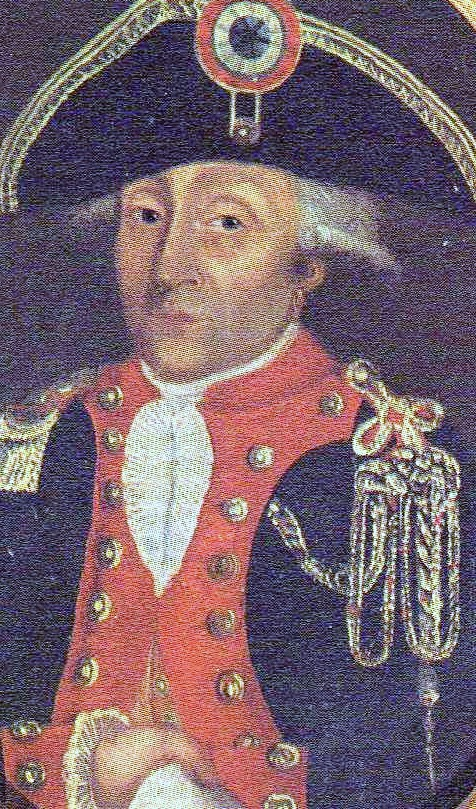
Officer of the gendarmerie nationale of the revolutionary era wearing a hat with a tricolor cockade

The French tricolor cockade was devised at the beginning of the French Revolution. On 12 July 1789 – two days before the storming of the Bastille – the revolutionary journalist Camille Desmoulins, calling on the Parisian crowd to revolt, asked the protesters what color to adopt as a symbol of the revolution, proposing either green (representing hope) or the blue of the American revolution, symbol of freedom and democracy. The protesters responded "The green! The green! We want green cockades!" Desmoulins then took a green leaf from the ground and pinned it to his hat. However, the green was abandoned after just one day because it was also the color of the king's brother, the reactionary Count of Artois, later King Charles X.

The following day, 13 July, an opportunity arose to create a cockade of different colors when those bourgeois who hoped to limit revolutionary excesses established a citizen militia. It was decided that the militia should be given a distinctive badge in the form of a two-colored cockade in the ancient colors of Paris, blue and red.

On 17 July, King Louis XVI went to Paris to meet the new French National Guard: its members wore the blue and red cockade of the militia, to which it would appear that the Marquis de Lafayette, commander of the Guard, had added a white band representing loyalty to the Sovereign. Louis XVI put it on his hat and – with some reluctance – approved the appointment of the revolutionary Jean Sylvain Bailly as mayor of Paris, and the formation of the National Guard led by Lafayette. Thus was born the French tricolor cockade. On the same day, the Count of Artois left France, along with members of the nobility supportive of absolute monarchy.

The tricolor cockade became the official symbol of the revolution in 1792, with the three colors now said to represent the three estates of French society: the clergy (blue), the nobility (white) and the third estate (red). The use of the three colors spread, and a law of 15 February 1794 made them the colors of the French national flag.

From August 1789, Italian demonstrators in sympathy with the French revolution began to use simple cockades of green leaves inspired by the primitive French cockade. From these evolved the red, white and green Italian tricolor cockade.

The 1831 play The Tricolour Cockade by the Cogniard Brothers, set during the French conquest of Algeria, led to the coining of the word chauvinism.

== Use ==
=== Use on institutional vehicles ===
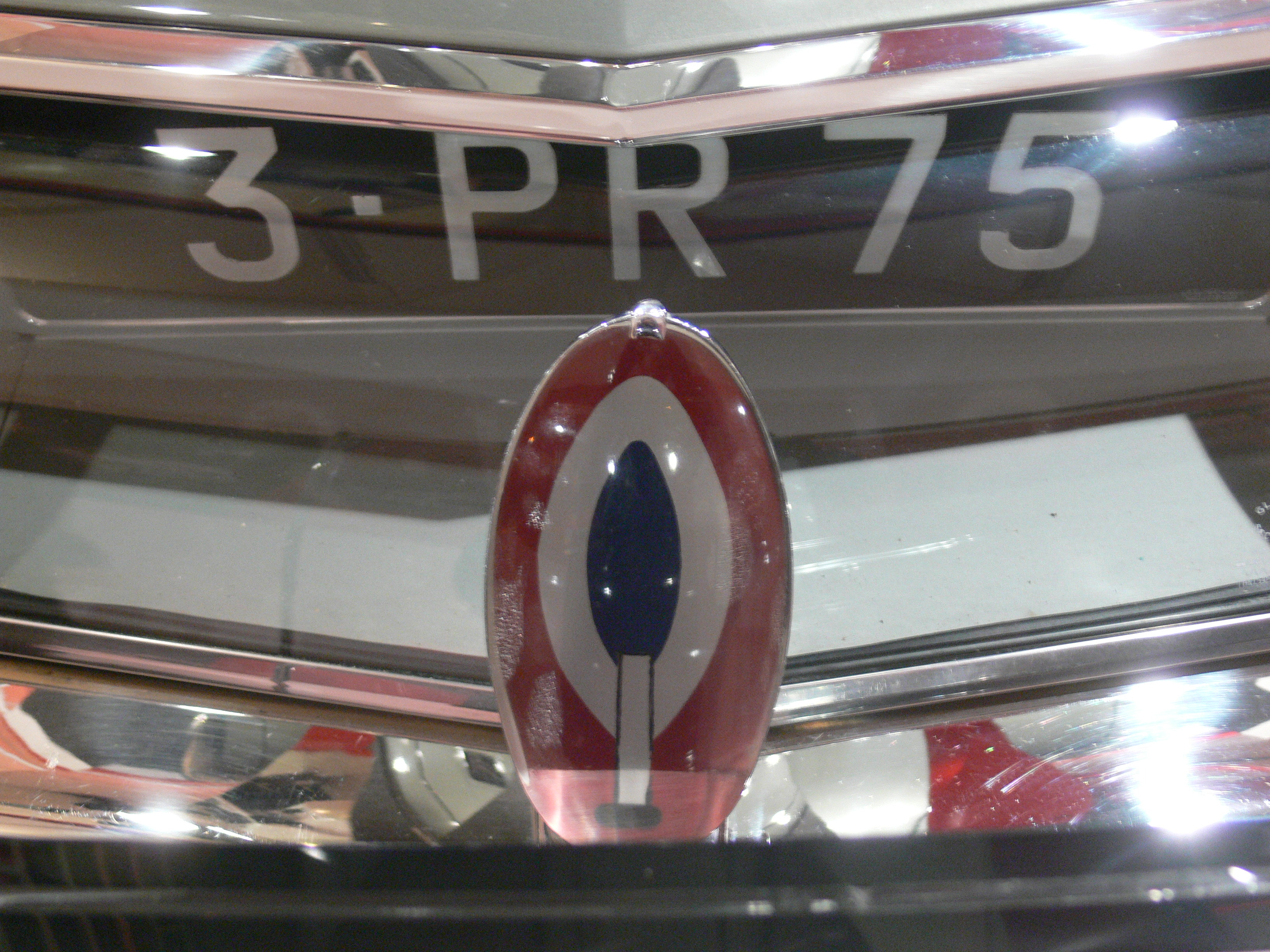
Detail of a presidential Citroën SM

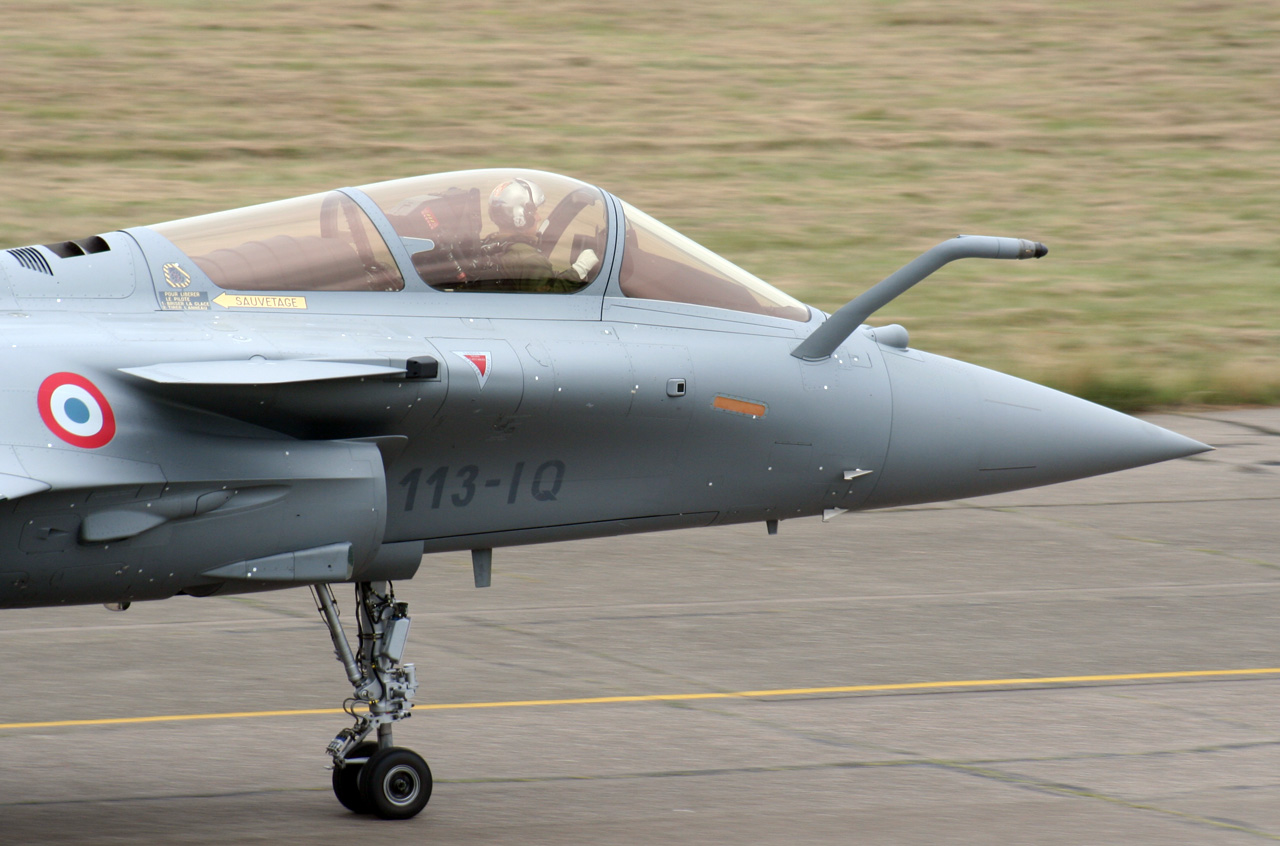
A Dassault Rafale with a French tricolor cockade

Decree no. 89-655 of 13 September 1989 forbids the use of the tricolor cockade on all land, sea and air vehicles, with the following exceptions:

- by the president of the French Republic;
- by members of the government of France;
- by members of French Parliament;
- by the president of the Constitutional Council;
- by the vice president of the Council of State;
- by the President of the Economic, Social and Environmental Council;
- by prefects in their own departments, and by sub-prefects on official duties in their arrondissements.

The use of the tricolor cockade is not permitted for mayors' vehicles, and offenders risk up to one year's imprisonment and a fine of €15,000.

=== Use on state aircraft ===
The use of the cockade on French military aircraft was first mandated by the Aéronautique Militaire in 1912, and subsequently became widespread during World War I. The French practice inspired the adoption of a similar roundel (with colours reversed) by the British Royal Flying Corps, and of comparable insignia by other nations. Cockades were, and still are, painted on the aircraft fuselages as the primary military aircraft insignia of the French Air Force; modified designs are used for other French government aircraft.

Cockades continue to be used on French state aircraft. After World War II a yellow border was added to the cockade, which was removed in 1984.

=== Other uses ===
The tricolor cockade is also used on certain elite uniforms, both military and civilian, which include headwear decorated with it. It is likewise an attribute of Marianne, the national allegorical representation of France, who is conventionally depicted wearing a Phrygian cap, sometimes decorated with a tricolor cockade. The cockade appears on mayors' badges; and on the sash worn by Miss France, as well as French-made "méduses" (jellyfish in English) plastic beach sandals.

== See also ==
- Flag of France
- Democratic-Republican Party, whose logo was nearly identical to the Cockade
