= Paulin Deslandes =

French playwright (1806-1866)

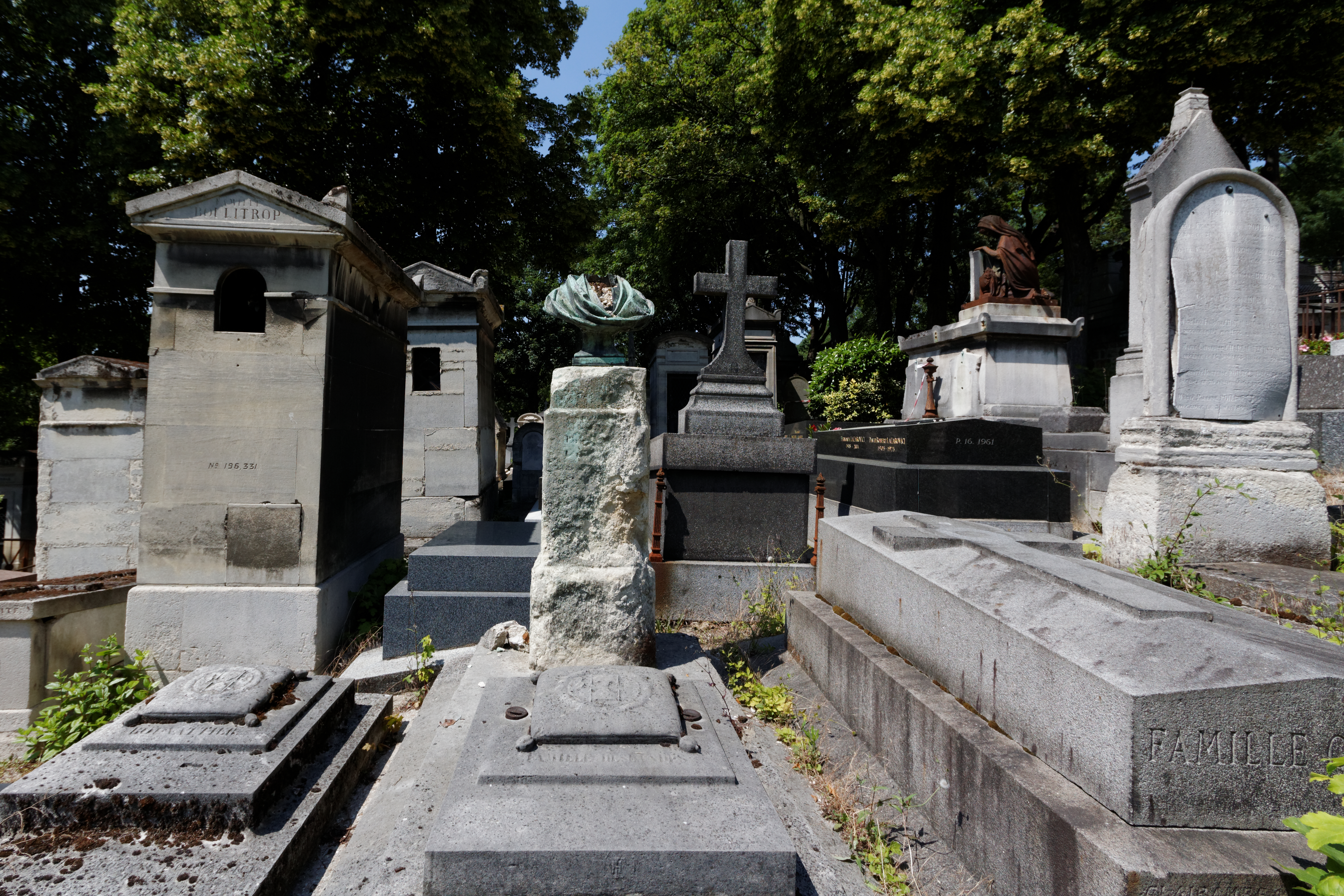
- Deslandes's grave at the Père Lachaise Cemetery after it has been vandalised
- Born: Nicolas Théodore Paulin Deslandes; 1806; Paris
- Died: 25 April 1866 (aged 59–60); Paris
- Occupation: Playwright

Paul Deslandes, full name Nicolas Théodore Paulin Deslandes, (1806 – 25 April 1866) was a 19th-century French playwright.

A singer at the Opéra Comique where he made his debut 3 April 1832, his plays were presented on the most important Parisian stages of the 19th century: Théâtre du Vaudeville, Théâtre du Palais-Royal, Théâtre de l'Ambigu etc.

He is buried at the Père Lachaise Cemetery. The bronze bust of E. Levêque adorning his tomb was beheaded by vandals.

== Works ==
- 1833: Étienne et Robert, drame populaire in 1 act, mingled with couplets, with Charles Didier
- 1833: La Modiste et le lord, comédie-anecdote mingled with song, in 2 acts, with Didier
- 1834: L'École des ivrognes, tableau populaire mingled with couplets, with Didier
- 1835: Le Lycéen, comédie en vaudeville in 1 act, with Didier
- 1835: Le Vendu, tableau populaire, in 1 act, mingled with couplets, with Didier
- 1836: L'Enfant du faubourg, drame populaire in 3 acts, mingled with couplets, with Didier
- 1836: L'art de ne pas payer son terme, ou Avis aux propriétaires, vaudeville in 1 act, with Didier
- 1836 Théodore, ou Heureux quand même, vaudeville in 1 act, with Jean-François-Alfred Bayard
- 1836: Un véritable amour, drama in 3 acts, mingled with song, with Didier
- 1837: L'Ange gardien, comedy in 3 acts, mingled with song, with Dupeuty
- 1837: Les Deux mères, vaudeville in 2 acts, with Eugène Cormon and Didier
- 1837: Haïdée la pestiférée, ou Femme, mère et maîtresse, drama in 3 acts
- 1837: Portier, je veux de tes cheveux !, historical anecdote in 1 act, with Théodore Cogniard and Didier
- 1838: A bas les hommes !, vaudeville in 2 acts, with Cogniard brothers and Ernest Jaime
- 1839: Dagobert, ou la Culotte à l'envers, drame historique et drôlatique, in 3 acts and in verses, preceded by a prologue speech in verses, by Jules-Henri Vernoy de Saint-Georges, Adolphe de Leuven and Deslandes, with de Leuven and de Saint-Georges
- 1839: Les Travestissemens, opéra comique in 1 act
- 1842: Tabarin, comedy in 3 acts mingled with couplets, with Dumanoir
- 1843: Les Canuts, comedy in 2 acts, mingled with couplets, with Antoine-François Varner
- 1843: Le Noctambule, comédie-vaudeville in 1 act, with Varner
- 1848: Le Buveur d'eau, tableau populaire in 1 act, with Charles Dupeuty
- 1848: Les Deux anges gardiens, comédie-vaudeville in 1 act
- 1848: Un et un font un, vaudeville in 1 act, with Adrien Decourcelle
- 1848: Mignonne, comédie-vaudeville in 1 act
- 1849: L'Impertinent, comédie-vaudeville in 2 acts, with Jean-François-Alfred Bayard
- 1850: Castagnette, vaudeville in 1 act
- 1850: La Gamine, vaudeville in 1 act
- 1851: Les Deux prudhommes, comédie-vaudeville in 1 act
- 1851: Jeanne, comédie-vaudeville in 3 acts, with Auguste Anicet-Bourgeois and Raymond Deslandes
- 1852: La Poissarde, ou les Halles en 1804, drama in 5 acts, with Ernest Bourget and Dupeuty
- 1853: Où peut-on être mieux ?, vaudeville in 1 act, with Charles Potier
- 1853: La Peine du talion, vaudeville in 1 act
- 1854: Bertrand, c'est Raton, vaudeville in 1 act
- 1854: Une idée de jeune fille, vaudeville in 1 act
- 1855: Le Jeu du cœur, vaudeville in 3 acts
- 1856: Un enfant du siècle, play in 3 acts, with Joachim Duflot
- 1857: Le Conscrit de Mont-rouge, drama in 5 acts, including 1 prologue
- 1857: Isambart marié, vaudeville in 3 acts
- 1858: La Noce de Tronquette, tableau populaire in 1 act
- 1858: Vingt ans ou la Vie d'un séducteur, drame-vaudeville en 5 acts, with Potier, 1858
- 1859: Les chevaliers du pince-nez, comédie vaudeville in 2 acts, with Eugène Grangé and Lambert-Thiboust, 1859
- 1860: Colombe et pinson, vaudeville in 1 act
- 1861: Grain-de-sable, vaudeville in 2 acts
- 1863: La Dernière grisette, vaudeville in 3 acts
- 1863: Pataud, vaudeville in 1 act
- 1867: Le Père Gachette, drama in 5 acts, in 8 tableaux
- undated: Album lyrique composé de romances, rondes et chansonnettes

== Bibliography ==
- Pierre Larousse, Nouveau Larousse illustré: dictionnaire universel, 1898, (p. 660)
- Jean-Louis Tamvaco, Ivor Forbes Guest, Les cancans de l'Opéra, 2000, (p. 610)
