= Henri Thiéry =

French journalist and playwright (1829–1872)

- Born: 1829; Paris, France
- Died: 1 August 1872 (aged 42–43); Bougival, France
- Occupations: journalist and playwright
- Known for: founder and director of the Journal des Demoiselles
- Notable work: see Works

Henri Thiéry (Paris, 1829 – Bougival, 1 August 1872) was a 19th-century French journalist and playwright.

The founder and director of the Journal des Demoiselles, a regular collaborator of Amédée de Jallais, his plays were presented on the most important Parisian stages of the 19th century: Théâtre des Délassements-Comiques, Théâtre des Folies-Dramatiques, Théâtre du Palais-Royal etc.

== Works ==
- 1852: Dans une armoire, folie-vaudeville in 1n act
- 1856: Le Boulanger à des écus, drame-vaudeville in 3 acts, with Amédée de Jallais
- 1856: Mon ami Dupont, vaudeville in 1 act, with de Jallais
- 1856: Manon de Nivelle, vaudeville in 3 acts, with de Jallais
- 1856: Pan, pan, c'est la fortune, comedy in 1 act, mingled with couplets, with de Jallais
- 1859: La Course aux canards, vaudeville in 3 canards, with de Jallais
- 1859: Le Naufrage de La Pérouse, drama in 5 acts and 9 tableaux, with de Jallais and Adolphe d'Ennery
- 1859: Arsène et Camille, vaudeville in 1 act, mingled with couplets, with A. Dupeuty
- 1860: Le Mariage de Fanchon, à-propos in 2 tableaux
- 1860: Chamarin le chasseur, comédie-vaudeville in 1 act, with Varin and de Jallais
- 1860: Monsieur !, vaudeville in 1 act
- 1861: Les Parisiens en voyage, vaudeville in 3 acts and 5 tableaux, with Hippolyte Bedeau
- 1861: Il pleut ! il pleut ! bergère, 1860 revue, in 3 acts
- 1861: Les Adieux du boulevard du Temple, fantasy play in 3 acts and 14 tableaux, preceded with Les Enfants de Momus, prologue in 2 tableaux
- 1862: La Manière de traiter les femmes comme elles le méritent, vaudeville in 1 act
- 1863: De Paris en Chine, ou Je ne suis pas Tissier, travel in 4 stations, with Varin and de Jallais
- 1863: La Chanson de la marguerite ou Un peu, beaucoup, passionnément, with Alfred Delacour
- 1863: Un joli cocher, vaudeville in 1 act, with A. Dupeuty
- 1864: Le Carnaval des canotiers, vaudeville in 4 acts, with de Jallais, Adolphe Dupeuty and Charles Dupeuty
- 1864: Les Calicots, vaudeville in 3 acts, with Paul Avenel
- 1865: Que c'est comme un bouquet de fleurs, revue in 3 acts and 12 tableaux, with Jules Renard
- 1865: Les contributions indirectes, with Hippolyte Cogniard
- 1866: L'Homme au pavé, vaudeville in 1 act
- 1867: Les Voyageurs pour l'exposition, revue fantaisie in 5 acts and 6 tableaux, with William Busnach
- 1868: Les plaisirs du dimanche, play in 4 acts, with Avenel
- 1869: L'Homme aux 76 femmes, comedy in 1 act, with Paul Siraudin
- undated: Le Grand journal, folie dramatique in 4 acts and six tableaux with prologue, with Ernest Blum

== Bibliography ==
- Revue et gazette musicale de Paris, vol.39, 1872, p. 247 (obituary)
