= Charles Dupeuty =

French librettist and playwright (1798–1865)

- Libretto of Tromb-Al-Ca-Zar by Bourget, Duperty and Offenbach
- Born: 6 February 1798; Paris
- Died: 26 March 1923 (aged 125); Saint-Germain-en-Laye
- Occupations: librettist and dramatist

Charles Désiré Dupeuty (6 February 1798 – 20 October 1865), was a 19th-century French librettist and playwright.

== Biography ==
After he studied at the Lycée Impérial, he enrolled in the army during the Hundred Days then worked as an employee. He made his debut in the theatre in 1821, and in 1825 founded the opposition newspaper La nouveauté.

He is famous for being one of the founders of the Société des auteurs dramatiques of which he was vice-président for six years.

Many of his plays were performed on the most important Parisians stages of the 19th century: Théâtre des Folies-Dramatiques, Théâtre du Vaudeville, Théâtre du Palais-Royal, Théâtre de la Gaîté, Théâtre de la Porte-Saint-Martin, Théâtre des Variétés etc.

Adolphe Dupeuty was his son.

== Works ==
Les deux Pêcheurs by Bourget and Dupeuty

- La Fête au village, 1821
- L'Arracheur de dents, folie-parade in 1 act, mingled with couplets, with Villeneuve, 1822
- Fille et garçon, ou la Petite orpheline, comédie en vaudevilles in 1 act, with Villeneuve, 1822
- Le Premier prix, ou les Deux artistes, comédie en vaudevilles in 1 act, with Villeneuve, 1822
- L'Actrice, comédie en vaudevilles in 1 act, with Villeneuve, 1823
- Mon ami Christophe, comédie en vaudevilles in 1 act, with W. Lafontaine, 1823
- Le Sergent de Chevert, vaudeville historique in 1 act, with Villeneuve, 1823
- Les Acteurs à l'essai, comédie en vaudevilles épisodique in 1 act, with Ferdinand de Villeneuve, 1824
- Un jour à Dieppe, with Langlé, 1824
- La Petite somnambule, comédie en vaudevilles in 1 act, with Villeneuve, 1824
- Ourika ou la Négresse, drama in 1 act, with Villeneuve, 1824
- Les Modistes, tableau-vaudeville in 1 act, with Villeneuve and Charles-Gaspard Delestre-Poirson, 1824
- Le Oui des jeunes filles, comédie en vaudevilles in 1 act, with La Salle, 1824
- Le Tableau de Téniers, ou l'Artiste et l'ouvrier, vaudeville in 1 act, with Villeneuve and Maurice Alhoy, 1824
- Pierre et Marie, ou le Soldat ménétrier, comédie en vaudevilles in 1 act, with Langlé and Villeneuve, 1824
- Léonide, comédie vaudeville in 3 acts, with Amable de Saint-Hilaire and Villeneuve, 1824
- Alice, ou les Six promesses, vaudeville in 1 act, with Villeneuve and Amable de Saint-Hilaire, 1825
- Monsieur Charles, ou Une matinée à Bagatelle, comédie en vaudevilles in 1 act, 1825
- Les Deux tailleurs, ou la Fourniture et la façon, comédie en vaudevilles in 1 act, with La Salle and Villeneuve, 1825
- Nicaise, ou le Jour des noces, comédie en vaudevilles in 1 act, with Villeneuve, 1825
- L'Anonyme, comédie en vaudevilles in 2 acts, with Villeneuve and Armand-François Jouslin de La Salle, 1826
- La Dette d'honneur, comédie en vaudevilles in 2 acts, with Langlé and Villeneuve, 1826
- Le Soldat en retraite, ou les Coups du sort, drama in 2 acts, with La Salle and Villeneuve, 1826
- Le Vieux pauvre, ou le Bal et l'incendie, melodrama in 3 acts et à grand spectacle, with Laloue and Villeneuve, 1826
- Le hussard de Felsheim, comédie en vaudevilles in 3 acts, with Villeneuve, 1827
- Monsieur Botte, comédie en vaudevilles in 3 acts, with Villeneuve, 1827
- Le Jeune maire, comédie en vaudevilles in 2 acts, with Saintine and Duvert, 1827
- Le Palais, la guinguette et le champ de bataille, prologue d'inauguration en 3 tableaux, à grand spectacle, with Brazier and Carmouche, 1827
- La Revue au galop, vaudeville in 1 act and a show, with Alhoy and La Salle, 1827
- La grande duchesse, comédie en vaudevilles in 1 act, with Saintine and Villeneuve, 1828
- Guillaume Tell, drame-vaudeville in 3 acts, with Saintine, Villeneuve and Adolphe Adam, 1828
- Le Sergent Mathieu, comédie en vaudevilles in 3 acts, with Saintine, 1828
- Les enfants trouvés, comédie en vaudevilles in 2 acts, with Saintine and Duvert, 1828
- Le Cousin Giraud, comédie en vaudevilles in 1 act, with Ferdinand Laloue and Antoine Jean-Baptiste Simonnin, 1828
- Les poletais, comédie en vaudevilles en 2 parts, 1828
- Le page de Woodstock, with Saintine and Duvert, 1828
- Les Omnibus, ou la Revue en voiture, vaudeville in 4 tableaux, with de Courcy and Espérance Hippolyte Lassagne, 1828
- L'Art de se faire aimer de son mari, comédie en vaudevilles in 3 acts, with Saintine, 1828
- La revue de Paris, scènes épisodiques mingled with couplets, with Rougemont and Courcy, 1829
- L'Humoriste, vaudeville, with Fulgence de Bury, 1829
- Cricri et ses mitrons, with Pierre-Frédéric-Adolphe Carmouche and Armand-François Jouslin de La Salle, 1829
- Madame Grégoire ou Le cabaret de la Pomme de pin, 1830
- Napoléon ou Schoenbrunn et Sainte Hélène, drame historique in 2 parts and 9 tableaux, music by Louis Alexandre Piccinni, 1830
- L'espionne, épisode de 1808 in 5 parts, mêlé de chant, with Achille d'Artois, 1830
- N, I, Ni, ou le Danger des Castilles, amphigouri-romantique in 5 acts and in sublimes verses, mêlé de prose ridicule, with Carmouche, de Courcy, Victor Hugo and Piccini, 1830
- Tristine ou Chaillot, Surêne et Charenton, trilogie sans préambule et sans suite, with Courcy and Carmouche, 1830
- La famille improvisée, scènes épisodiques, with Nicolas Brazier and Duvert, 1831
- Angélique et Jeanneton, comédie en vaudevilles in 4 acts, with X.-B. Saintine, 1831
- Victorine ou la nuit porte conseil, drama in 5 acts, with Dumersan, 1831
- Marionnette, parody in 5 acts and in verses by Marion Delorme, with Duvert, 1831
- Le Maréchal Brune, ou la Terreur de 1815, événement historique in 4 tableaux, with Fontan, 1831
- Madame Grégoire ou Le Cabaret de la pomme de pin, song in 2 acts, with Rochefort and Charles de Livry, 1831
- La vie de Molière, historical comedy in 3 acts, with Étienne Arago, 1832
- L'homme de la nature et l'homme policé, vaudeville in 2 acts and 5 tableaux, with de Kock, 1832
- Le courrier de la malle, comedy in 3 acts, with Rougemont and Courcy, 1832
- Le Barbier du roi d'Aragon, drama in 3 acts, in prose, with Jean-Joseph Ader and Louis Marie Fontan, 1832
- Le Fils de l'Empereur, histoire contemporaine in 2 acts, with Théodore Cogniard and Fontan, 1832
- La Camargo ou L'opéra en 1750, comedy in 4 acts, mingled with song, with Fontan, 1833
- Bergami et la reine d'Angleterre, drama in 5 acts and 6 tableaux, with Maurice Alhoy and Fontan, 1833
- Le Gentilhomme, vaudeville anecdotique in 1 act, with de Courcy, 1833
- Faublas, comedy i act mingled with songs with Léon Lévy Brunswick and Victor Lhérie, 1833
- Le comte de Saint-Germain, play in 3 acts, mingled with songs, with Fontan, 1834
- La croix d'or, 1835
- Madelon-Friquet, comédie en vaudevilles in 2 acts, with Rougemont, 1835
- Analyse de Napoléon à Schoenbrunn et à Sainte-Hélène, with François Regnier de La Brière, 1835
- Jean Jean don Juan, parody in five plays, with Achille d'Artois and Michel-Nicolas Balisson de Rougemont, 1835
- Un de plus, comédie en vaudevilles in 3 acts, with Paul de Kock, 1835
- La croix d'or, comedy in 2 acts, with Rougemont, 1835
- Cornaro, tyran pas doux, translation in 4 acts and in verses of Angelo, tyran de Padoue, with Victor Hugo and Félix-Auguste Duvert, 1834
- Paris dans la comète, revue vaudeville en 1 act, with Étienne Arago and Rougemont, 1835
- Le Barbier du roi d'Aragon, drama in 3 acts, in prose, with Ader and Fontan, 1836
- Pierre le Rouge, comedy in 3 acts, with Benjamin Antier and Rougemont, 1836
- Mariana, comedy in 3 acts, with Fontan, 1836
- Madeleine, drame-vaudeville in 3 acts, with de Kock, 1836
- M. Dasnière ou la suite du Sourd, comédie parade in 1 act mingled with couplets, with Dumersan, 1836
- La liste des notables, comedy in two acts, mingled with couplets, with Alexis Decomberousse, 1836
- L'Homme à femmes, comédie en vaudevilles in 5 acts, with Courcy, 1836
- L'ange gardien, comedy in 3 acts, mingled with songs, with Paulin Deslandes, 1837
- La Folie Beaujon ou l'Enfant du mystère, vaudeville in 1 act, with Edmond Rochefort, 1837
- La chevalière d'Eon, comédie historique in two acts, mingled with couplets, 1837
- Les dames de la halle, comédie-anecdote in 2 acts, with Vanderburch, 1838
- Mademoiselle, comédie en vaudevilles in 2 acts, with Laurencin, 1838
- Le Procès du maréchal Ney, (1815), historical drama in 4 tableaux, with Fontan, 1838
- Anacréon, ou Enfant chéri des dames, comedy in 1 act mingled with couplets, with Frédéric de Courcy, 1838
- Arthur ou 16 ans après, drame vaudeville in 2 acts, with Fontan, 1838
- Le Pauvre idiot, ou le Souterrain d'Heilberg, drama in 5 acts and 8 tableaux, with Fontan, 1838
- Argentine, comedy in 2 acts, mingled with couplets, with Michel Delaporte and Gabriel de Lurieu, 1839
- Balochard ou Samedi, dimanche ou lundi, vaudeville in three acts, with Louis-Émile Vanderburch, 1839
- Les filles de l'enfer, vaudeville fantastique en 4 acts and six tableaux, with Charles Desnoyer, 1839
- L'Ange dans le monde et le diable à la maison, comedy in 3 acts, with de Courcy, 1839
- La belle Bourbonnaise, comédie en vaudevilles in two acts, with Michel-Nicolas Balisson de Rougemont and Ferdinand Langlé, 1839
- Mignonne, ou Une aventure de Bassompierre, comedy in 2 acts, mingled with songs, with de Courcy, 1839
- Les Floueurs, ou l'Exposition de la flibusterie frrrançaise, parade in 1 act, with Langlé, 1839
- Bonaventure, comédie en vaudevilles in 3 acts and 4 tableaux, with de Courcy, 1840
- La Correctionnelle, scènes épisodiques, with Maurice Alhoy et Rougemont, 1840
- Le grand duc, proverbe in 1 act, with Courcy, 1840
- Matelots et matelottes, tableau vaudeville in 1 act, with Dumersan, 1840
- Les amours de Psyché, 1841
- Le Perruquier de l'empereur, drama in 5 acts, 1841
- Deux dames au violon, pochade in 1 act, with Cormon, 1841
- Les amours de Psyché, pièce fantastique, mingled with song, in 3 acts and 10 tableaux, preceded by l'Olympe, prologue, with Michel Delaporte, 1841
- Le Père Trinquefort, vaudeville in 1 act, with Cormon, 1841
- La maîtresse de poste, comedy in 1 act, with de Courcy, 1841
- Lucrèce, comedy in 3 acts mingled with song, with Bourgeois, 1841
- Paris la nuit, drame populaire in 5 acts and 8 tableaux, with Cormon, 1842
- Gringalet, fils de famille, comédie-parade in three acts, with Dumersan, 1842
- Les Deux sœurs de charité, drama in 3 acts, mingled with song, 1842
- Les petits mystères de Paris, vaudeville in 3 acts and 6 tableaux, with Cormon, 1842
- Les Grisettes en Afrique, ou le Harem, play in 2 acts and 3 tableaux, mingled with vaudevilles, with Carmouche, 1842
- Les Chevau-légers de la Reine, comedy in 3 acts, mingled with song, with Bernard Lopez, 1842
- Comédiens et marionnettes, vaudeville in 2 acts, with Delaporte, 1842
- Les Buses-graves, parodie des Burgraves , in 3 acts and in verses, with Langlé, 1843
- Le trombone du régiment, comédie en vaudevilles in three acts, with Cormon and Saint-Amand, 1843
- Les Cuisines parisiennes, vaudeville populaire in 3 acts, with Cormon, 1843
- Une campagne à deux, comedy in 1 act, 1843
- Ravel en voyage, vaudeville in 1 act, with Varin, 1844
- Le Troubadour omnibus, folie-vaudeville in 1 act, with Langlé, 1844
- Le canal Saint-Martin, drama in 5 acts et 7 tableaux, with Eugène Cormon, 1845
- Riche d'amour, comédie en vaudevilles in 1 act, with Duvert, Saintine and Augustin-Théodore de Lauzanne de Vauroussel, 1845
- Le lait d'ânesse, comédie en vaudevilles in 1 act, with de Lurieu, 1846
- La planète à Paris, revue of 1846 in 3 acts, with Duvert and Lurieu, 1846
- Les brodeuses de la Reine, comédie en vaudevilles in 1 act, with Gabriel de Lurieu, 1846
- La Veuve de quinze ans, comédie en vaudevilles in 1 act, 1846
- La Descente de la Courtille, vaudeville-ballet-pantomime in 2 tableaux, with Théophile Marion Dumersan, 1846
- Le chevalier d'Essonne, comédie en vaudevilles in 3 acts, with Auguste Anicet-Bourgeois, 1847
- Le Moulin à paroles, comédie en vaudevilles in 1 act, with de Lurieu, 1847
- Les Trois portiers, comédie en vaudevilles in 2 acts, with Vanderburch, 1847
- Fualdès, drama in five acts and eight tableaux, with Eugène Grangé, 1848
- Le Buveur d'eau, tableau populaire in 1 act, with Paulin Deslandes, 1848
- Le chevalier Muscadin, comédie en vaudevilles in 2 acts, with Auguste Anicet-Bourgeois, 1849
- L'hôtel de la tête noire, drama in 5 acts and 9 tableaux, with Cormon and Grangé, 1849
- Le prophète, with Eugène Grangé, 1849
- Gracioso, ou le Père embarrassant, vaudeville in 3 acts, with Grangé, 1849
- L'hurluberlu, comedy in 1 act, with de Courcy, 1849
- La Vie de café, play in 3 acts, mingled with songs, with Vanderburch, 1850
- Les aventures de Suzanne, drama in five acts and eight tableaux, with Eugène Guinot, 1851
- Meublé et non meublé, vaudeville in 1 act, with Grangé, 1851
- L'Eau de javelle, comédie en vaudevilles in 1 act, with Lurieu, 1852
- Un frère terrible, comédie en vaudevilles in 1 act, with Guinot, 1852
- Un vieux de la vieille roche, comédie en vaudevilles in 1 act, with Grangé, 1852
- La poissarde, ou Les Halles en 1804, drama in five acts, with Ernest Bourget and Deslandes, 1852
- Hamlet, prince de Danemark, with Lurieu, 1853
- La Faridondaine, drama mingled with songs and new music, in five acts and huit tableaux, with Bourget, 1853
- La Chine à Paris, 1854
- Quatorze de dames, comédie en vaudevilles in 1 act, 1854
- Les gueux de Béranger, drama in five acts, mêlé de chant, with Jules Moinaux, 1855
- La Treille du Roi, opéra comique in 1 act, music by Paul Henrion, 1855
- Pilbox et Friquet, à-propos in 1 act, mêlé de chant, with Bourget, 1855
- Tromb-al-ca-zar, ou Les criminels dramatiques, bouffonnerie musicale in 1 act, with Bourget and Jacques Offenbach, 1856
- Les deux pêcheurs, 1857
- Le père aux écus, drama in 5 acts, with Ferdinand Dugué, 1857
- Le marquis d'Argentcourt, comédie en vaudevilles in 3 acts, with Delaporte and Clairville, 1857
- Une tempête dans une baignoire, one-act play, with de Lurieu, 1859
- Fanfan le batonniste, comédie en vaudevilles in 2 acts, with de Lurieu, 1859
- Le paratonnerre, comédie en vaudevilles in two acts, with Lurieu, 1860
- P'tit fils p'tit mignon, vaudeville en 1 act, with de Lurieu, 1860
- Le Maréchal Ney, drame historique in five acts and onze tableaux, with Auguste Anicet-Bourgeois and Adolphe d'Ennery, 1863
- Le carnaval des canotiers, vaudeville in 4 acts, with Henri Thiéry and Amédée de Jallais, 1864
- Les carrières de Montmartre, mélodrame populaire in 5 acts, 8 tableaux and a prologue, with Bourget, 1865
- La poissarde ou Les halles en 1804, 1868
- La Permission de minuit, tableau militaire, with Moinaux, 1868
- Ce que j'éprouve loin de Vous, romance, undated
- Si j'étais petit papier, Rondoletto, undated
- La Rose d'amour, Romance, undated

== Bibliography ==
- Gustave Vapereau, Dictionnaire universel des contemporains, Vol.1, 1870, (p. 592)
- Louis Bethléem, Les Pièces de théâtre, 1924, (p. 171)
