= Adolphe Dupeuty =

French journalist and playwright (1828–1884)

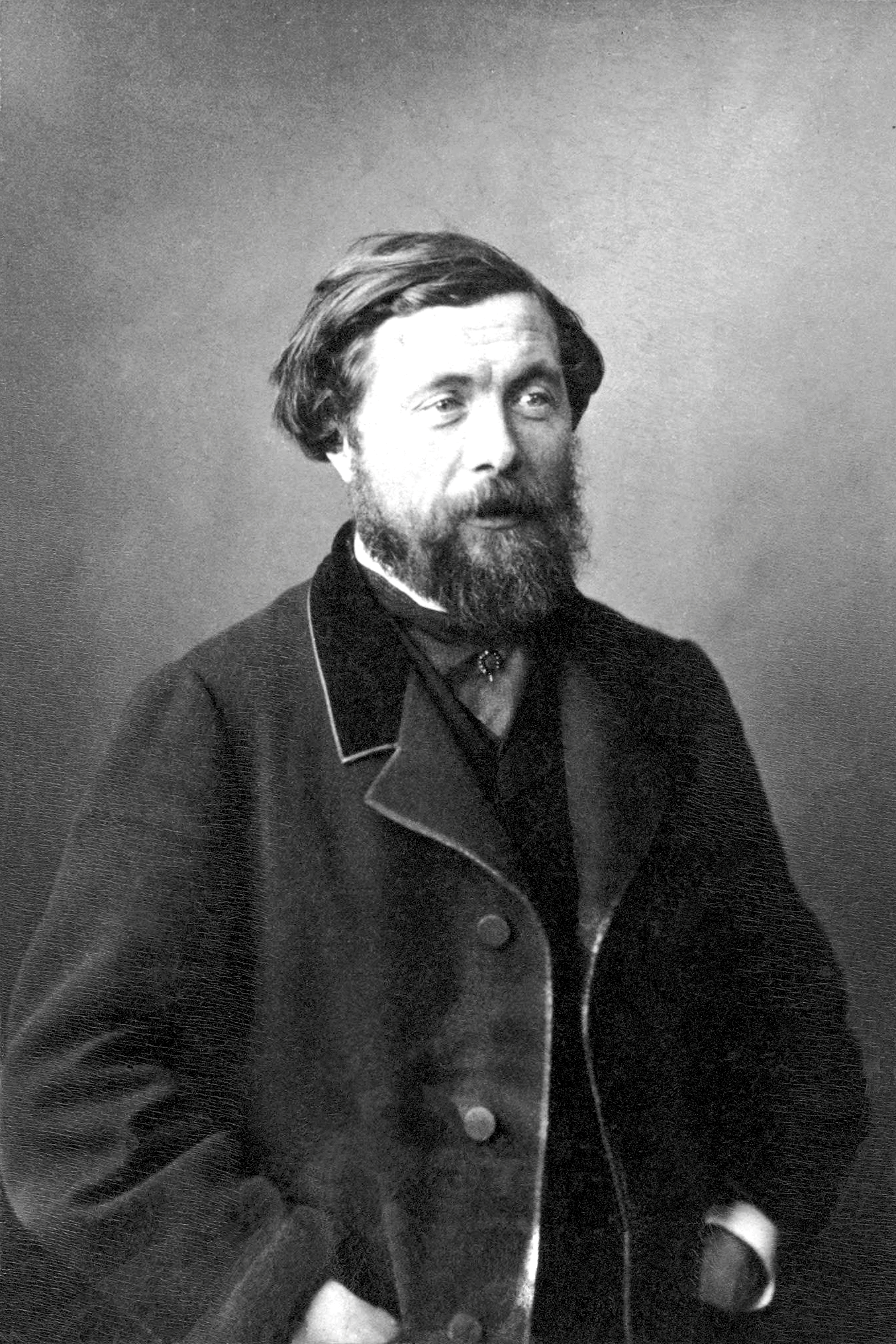

Adolphe Ferdinand Dupeuty (born in Paris, 1828 – died in L'Haÿ-les-Roses 13 March 1884) was a French journalist and playwright, the son of Charles Dupeuty.

A secretary of the Paris Opera from 1850 to 1852, a columnist from 1856 at Le Figaro, Figaro-programme, Le Charivari and at the Événement where he was responsible for the Theater courier section, his plays were presented on the most important Parisian stages of the 19th century: Théâtre des Folies-Dramatiques, Théâtre Marigny, Théâtre du Palais-Royal etc.

== Works ==
- 1843: Une campagne à deux, comedy in 1 act, with Ernest Jaime
- 1849: L'Hôtel de la Tête Noire, drama in 5 acts and 9 tableaux, with Eugène Cormon and Eugène Grangé, 1849
- 1853: Les canotiers de la Seine, vaudeville aquatique in 3 acts, with Henri Thiéry
- 1857: Fualdès, drama in five acts and eight tableaux, with Grangé
- 1857: Arsène et Camille, vaudeville in 1 act, mingled with couplets, with Henri Thiéry
- 1863: Un joli cocher, vaudeville in 1 act, with Thiéry
- 1864: Où est la femme ?, foreword by Jules Noriac, E. Dentu
- 1864: Le Carnaval des canotiers, vaudeville in 4 acts, with Charles Dupeuty, Amédée de Jallais and Thiéry
- 1864: En classe ! Mesdemoiselles, folie-vaudeville in 1 act, with de Jallais
- 1867: Le serment de bichette, vaudeville in 1 act, with Hippolyte Bedeau
- 1874: Blanche de Césanne, proverbe in 1 act

== Bibliography ==
- Louis Gustave Vapereau, Dictionnaire universel des contemporains, 1865, p. 579
- Ferdinand Natanael Staaff, La littérature française depuis la formation de la langue jusqu'à nos jours, 1884, p. 1243
