= Ernest Jaime =

French watercolourist, lithographer, art historian and playwright

- Born: Jean-François Gem; 1804; Paris
- Died: 17 June 1884 (aged 79–80); Versailles
- Occupations: Watercolourist, lithographer, art historian and playwright
- Years active: 1832-1871

Jean-François-Ernest Jaime (28 April 1804 – 7 June 1884) was a French watercolourist, lithographer, art historian and playwright. He was the father of dramatist Adolphe Jaime (1824–1901).

He collaborated to Le Figaro and La Caricature.

His plays were presented on the most significant Parisian stages of the 19th century: Variétés, Gaîté, Palais-Royal, etc. He also authored some songs.

== Works ==
=== Theatre ===
- 1832: La Sylphide, drama in 2 acts mixed with song, with Jules Seveste
- 1832: Le Chevreuil, comédie en vaudevilles in 3 acts, with Léon Halévy
- 1832: Folbert, ou le Mari de la cantatrice, comedy in 1 act mixed with song, with Halévy
- 1832: Une course en fiacre, comédie en vaudevilles in 2 acts
- 1832: Le Grand Seigneur et la Paysanne, ou Une leçon d'égalité, comedy in 2 acts mixed with song, with Halévy and de Leuven
- 1832: Grillo, ou le Prince et le banquier, comédie en vaudevilles in 2 acts, with Halévy
- 1832: La Métempsycose, bêtise in 1 act mixed with song, with de Courcy
- 1833: L'Assassin, folie-vaudeville in 1 act, with Lauzanne
- 1833: Le Baptême du petit Gibou, ou Madame Pochet marraine, pièce grivoise in 2 acts mixed with song, with Dumersan
- 1833: L'Élève de la nature, ou Jeanne et Jenny, fice-act play in 2 parts mixed with song, with Jules Seveste
- 1833: M. Mouflet, ou le Duel au 3e étage, comédie en vaudevilles in 1 act, with L. Halévy
- 1833: Les Fileuses, comédie en vaudevilles in 1 act
- 1834: L'Aiguillette bleue, historical vaudeville in 3 acts, with d'Artois and Masson
- 1834: Le Mentor faubourien, tableau-vaudeville in 1 act
- 1834: L'Autorité dans l'embarras, comédie en vaudevilles in 1 act, with Decomberousse
- 1835: Le Père Goriot, drama-vaudeville in 3 acts, with Decomberousse et Théaulon
- 1835: La Tirelire, tableau-vaudeville in 1 act, with the Cogniard brothers
- 1836: Carmagnole, ou Les Français sont des farceurs, épisode of the Italian wars in 1 act, with Pittaud de Forges and Théaulon
- 1836: Geneviève, ou la Grisette de province, drama in 4 acts mixed with songs, with Halévy
- 1837: Louise Duval, ou Un préjugé, drama in 4 acts mixed with songs, with L. Halévy
- 1837: Michel, ou Amour et Menuiserie, comédie en vaudevilles in 4 acts, with Duvert and Lauzanne
- 1838: Le Marquis de Brunoy, play in 5 acts, with Théaulon
- 1838: À bas les hommes !, vaudeville in 2 acts, with Deslandes and the Cogniard brothers
- 1838: Le Cabaret de Lustucru, comédie en vaudevilles in 1 act, with Arago and Dumanoir
- 1838: Rigoletti, ou le Dernier des fous, vaudeville in 1 act, with Alboize de Pujol
- 1841: Pour mon fils, comédie en vaudevilles in 2 acts, with Bayard
- 1841: Les Trois Étoiles, comedy in 1 act mixed with songs, with Halévy
- 1842: Les Informations conjugales, vaudeville in 1 act, with Duvert and Lauzanne
- 1842: Jaket's Club, vaudeville in 2 acts, with de Villeneuve
- 1843: L'Art de tirer des carottes, vaudeville in 1 act, with Marc-Michel
- 1843: Une campagne à deux, comedy in 1 act, with Charles Dupeuty
- 1844: Le Carlin de la marquise, vaudeville in 2 acts, with Clairville
- 1844: Un ange tutélaire, comédie en vaudevilles in 1 act, with Lockroy and Marc-Michel
- 1845: Le Diable à quatre, vaudeville-féerie in 3 acts, with Delaporte
- 1845: La Morale en action, comédie en vaudevilles in 1 act, with de Villeneuve
- 1845: Le Loup-garou, vaudeville in 2 acts, with Varin
- 1847: Les Étouffeurs de Londres, ou La taverne des Sept-cadrans, drama in 5 acts, with Foucher
- 1848: L'Illustration, vaudeville with magic lantern colored glasses, with Brunswick
- 1848: Le Réveil du lion, comédie en vaudevilles in 2 acts, with Bayard
- 1850: Célestin père et fils, ou Jadis et Aujourd'hui, opening prologue in 3 tableaux, with Lefebvre
- 1850: Montansier père et fils, vaudeville in 2 tableaux, with H. Lefebvre
- 1853: Le Célèbre Vergeot, vaudeville in 1 act, with Varin
- 1854: La Corde sensible, vaudeville in 1 act, with Clairville and Lambert-Thiboust
- 1856: Six demoiselles à marier, operetta in 1 act, with Choler, music by Delibes
- 1872: Le Jour de la paye, verse comedy in 1 act

=== History ===
- 1852: À Sa Majesté l'Empereur Napoléon III, 2 vol.
- 1866: À soixante ans
- 1868: Un peu de tout (heures perdues)
- 1871: Les Prussiens à Versailles et dans le département de Seine-et-Oise
- 1871: Souvenirs de 1848 à 1871

=== Songs ===
- 1850-1851: Chansons populaires, dédiées aux ouvriers amis de l'ordre
- 1866: Le Nouveau Genre français
- 1871: La Revue du 29 juin 1871 : l'Emprunt, la Revanche; épître à M. Thiers

=== Lithographies and watercolours ===
- 1838: Musée de la caricature, ou recueil des caricatures les plus remarquables publiées en France depuis le XIVe siècle jusqu’à nos jours, 2 vols. Delloye
- 1839: Paris au XIXe siècle. Recueil de scènes de la vie parisienne dessinées d'après nature, collective work, with Roger de Beauvoir, Edmond Burat de Gurgy, Albéric Second, Achille Devéria, Adolphe Adam, Paul Gavarni, Honoré Daumier etc.
- 1842: Bichette, reine des amours
- 1842: La Cocotte
- 1857: Douze vues des châteaux et parcs de Versailles, dessinées d'après nature
- 1859: Saint-Germain, le château, la ville et la forêt dessinés d'après nature
- 1859: Le Palais impérial de Saint-Cloud, le parc et la ville, dessinés d'après nature
- 1860: Aux typographes versaillais
- 1867: Palais et jardins de Versailles et de Trianon, vingt-six vues dessinées d'après nature
- Dieppe, ses environs et ses habitans, ou choix de vues, monumens et costumes
- Environs de Berne, peintre à son chevalet devant un moulin à eau, aquarelle

== Bibliography ==
- Pierre Larousse, Grand dictionnaire universel du XIXe siècle, supplément, vol.16, 1877, p. 997
- Émile Bellier de La Chavignerie, Dictionnaire général des artistes de l'école française, 1882
- Gérald Schurr, Les Petits maîtres de la peinture, 1979, p. 40
