= Paul Avenel =

French chansonnier and journalist (1823–1902)

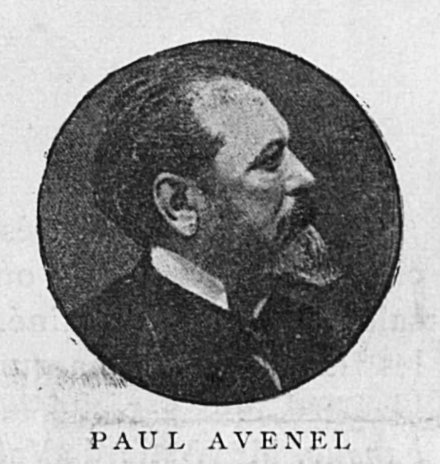
- Portrait by Pierre Petit
- Born: 9 October 1823; Chaumont-en-Vexin
- Died: 14 April 1902 (aged 78); Paris
- Occupations: writer, poet, goguettier, playwright, chansonnier, journalist

Paul Avenel (9 October 1823 – 14 April 1902) was a 19th-century French writer, poet, goguettier, playwright, chansonnier and journalist. He was the elder brother of historian Georges Avenel.

Graduated in 1840 from an école supérieure de commerce, Avenel started studying medicine in 1845 and was an ardent student of Roux, Orfila and Velpeau.

After the 1848 Revolution led him into journalism, he collaborated with many literary and political newspapers. He established and directed le Daguerréotype théâtral Le Journal de la jeunesse, worked for the Lycée français, the Mousquetaire, etc. He also wrote poetry, theatre plays and novels.

Avenel was a member of the Goguette de la Lice chansonnière, the Société des auteurs et compositeurs dramatiques, the Société des gens de lettres and the Société des auteurs, compositeurs et éditeurs de musique.

== Works ==
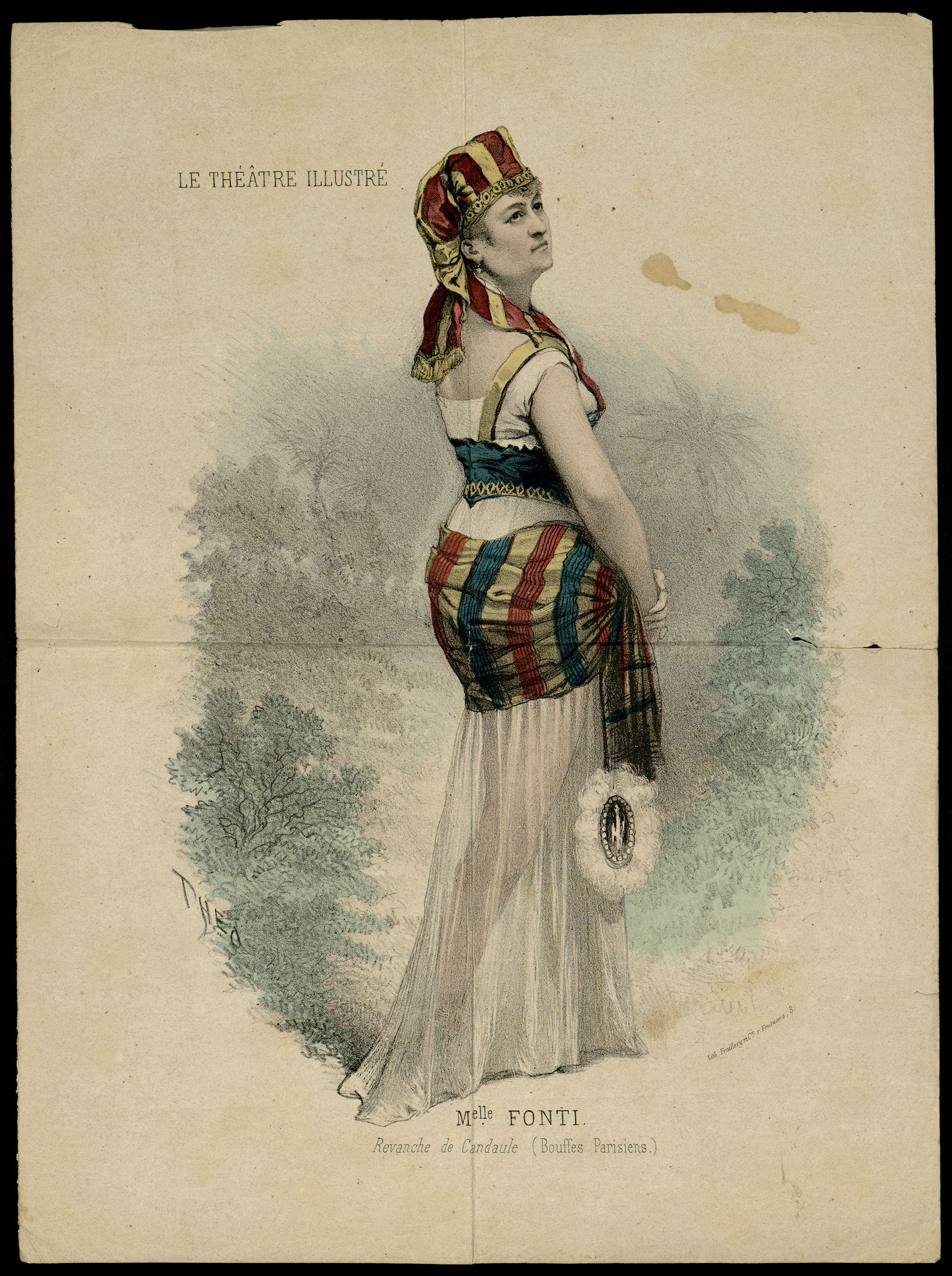
M.elle Fonti, costume design for La revanche de Candaule (undated).

Poetry

- 1855: Alcôve et Boudoir, scènes de la comédie humaine
- L’Antichambre en amour, comedy in verse
- 1867: Les Chansons
- 1870: Les Chansons politiques

Theatre

- Un Homme sur le gril, Variétés;
- Les Jarretières d’un huissier, Palais-Royal;
- Le Gendre de M. Caboche, Théâtre des Variétés;
- 1864: Les Calicots, comédie-vaudeville in 3 acts with Henri Thiéry, Théâtre des Folies-Dramatiques;
- La Paysanne des Abruzzes, drama in 5 acts, Théâtre Beaumarchais;
- Les Plaisirs du Dimanche, comédie-vaudeville in four acts, Folies-Dramatiques;
- Les Amoureux pris par les pieds;
- Soyez donc concierge;
- Un oncle du Midi;
- Le Beau Maréchal;
- La Revanche de Candaule, opéra comique, Théâtre des Bouffes-Parisiens;
- 1860: Les Chasseurs de Pigeons, vaudeville in three acts, with Amédée de Jallais, Folies-Dramatiques;
- Les Deux Apprentis, drama in four acts;
- Les Amoureux de Lucette,
- 1875: La belle Lina, opérette-bouffe, with Paul Mahalin, music by Charles Hubans, Théâtre de l'Athénée (rue Scribe) etc.

Novels

- Le Coin du feu;
- 1852: Les Tablettes d’un fou ou le Voyage entre deux mondes, 2 vol.
- Les Étudiants de Paris;
- Les Calicots;
- 1860: Le Roi de Paris, roman historique;
- 1864: Le Duc des Moines, roman historique;
- Les Lipans ou les Brigands normands, etc.

== Sources ==
- Ernest Glaeser, Biographie nationale des contemporains, Paris, Glaeser et Cie, 1878, p. 14.
- Louis Henry Lecomte Galerie de chansonniers, Paul Avenel, La Chanson, n°5, September 1878, p. 59.
