= Victor Parizot =

French composer

Victor Parizot (8 September 1819 – 26 March 1860) was a 19th-century French composer. With Ernest Bourget and Paul Henrion, he was one of the founders of the SACEM (Société des auteurs, compositeurs et éditeurs de musique).
