= Krokodil (disambiguation) =

Krokodil was a satirical magazine published in the Soviet Union.

Krokodil may also refer to:

- Krokodil Literary Festival, an annual event in Belgrade, Serbia
- Krokodil, a 1970s Swiss band on the Nurse with Wound list
- Mil Mi-24, a helicopter, nicknamed Крокодил or Krokodil due to its camouflage scheme
- Crocodile (locomotive) (German Krokodil), an electric locomotive
- "Krokodil", a 2012 single released by St. Vincent
- Krokodil, the street name for the opioid desomorphine

== See also ==
- Krokodiloes, an a cappella group at Harvard University
- Crocodile (disambiguation)
