= L'oca del Cairo =

Unfinished opera by Wolfgang Amadeus Mozart

- Opera buffa fragment by W. A. Mozart
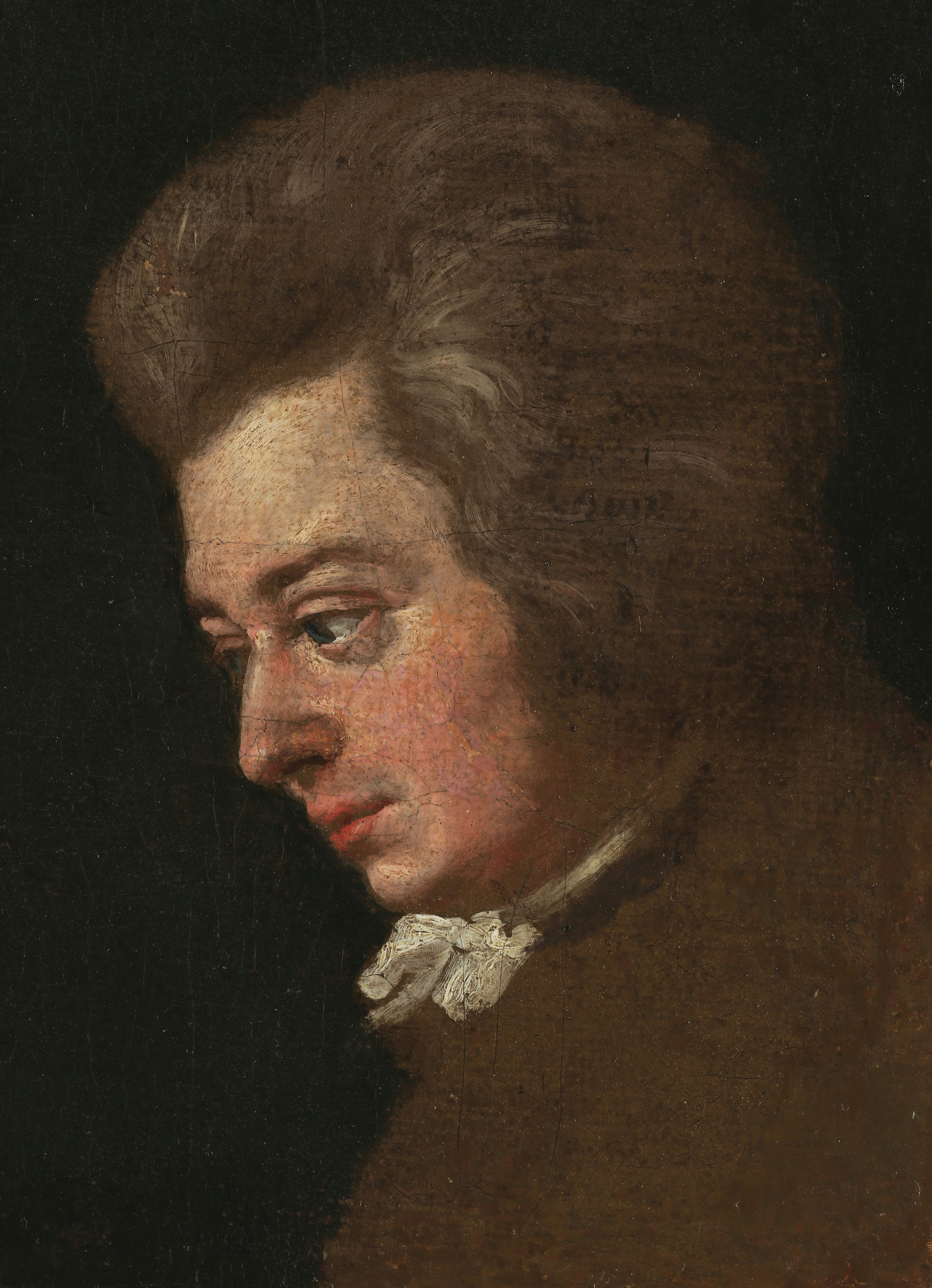
- Detail of Lange's 1782–83 Mozart portrait
- Translation: The Goose of Cairo
- Librettist: Giambattista Varesco
- Language: Italian

L'oca del Cairo (The Goose of Cairo or The Cairo Goose, K. 422) is an incomplete Italian opera buffa in three acts, begun by Wolfgang Amadeus Mozart in July 1783 but abandoned in October. The complete libretto by Giambattista Varesco remains. Mozart composed seven of the ten numbers of the first act, plus some recitative, as well a sketch for a further aria; the extant music amounts to about 45 minutes.

The autograph manuscript of the opera is preserved in the Berlin State Library.

== Background ==
Mozart's correspondence shows he wanted to write a comic opera to a new text for the Italian company in Vienna, after being commissioned to write one by Count Franz Orsini-Rosenberg, the director of the court theatre. He had only just met Lorenzo Da Ponte, who would later pen the libretti for several of Mozart's most successful operas, but Da Ponte was not available (he was working as a librettist with Antonio Salieri) so Mozart turned to Giambattista Varesco, librettist for Mozart's earlier opera Idomeneo. Mozart's urgent need of a poet is attested by his willingness to work with someone, who in his opinion had "not the slightest knowledge or experience of the theatre". He was also evidently keen to continue his streak of popularity, implemented by his previous opera Die Entführung aus dem Serail. Eventually Mozart realized the hopelessness of the project and abandoned Varesco's libretto after six months because of its silly ending, a farcical travesty of the Trojan Horse legend.

Prior to the abandonment of the project, Mozart had demanded changes to Varesco's text, but it was to no avail. He stopped working on the opera completely on 10 February 1784, writing: "I've no thought of giving it at present", later going on to cite the importance of his other projects which would garner him further financial stability.

== Performance history ==
Several versions have been prepared by adapting other music. The first performance (in concert) was in Frankfurt in April 1860 with numbers taken from Lo sposo deluso and some concert arias.

The first stage performance was given on 6 June 1867 in Paris at Louis Martinet's Théâtre des Fantaisies-Parisiennes in a 2-act French adaptation, L'oie du Caire, by the Belgian librettist Victor Wilder, who added a new conclusion, and a musical arrangement by the conductor, Charles Constantin, who orchestrated the music and added other pieces by Mozart to complete it.

Fragments from L'oca del Cairo, Lo sposo deluso, and Der Schauspieldirektor have been combined as Waiting for Figaro, performed in 2002 by the Bampton Classical Opera. In 1991, the Neuköllner Oper in Berlin performed a combined version of L'oca del Cairo and Lo sposo deluso as Die Gans von Kairo with a new libretto by Peter Lund and additional compositions by Winfried Radeke. Lund added three muses commenting on the absurdity of the plot, highlighting the librettist's arbitrariness and thus commenting on the historical events leading to the opera being left uncompleted.

== Roles ==
Roles, voice types, and premiere cast
Role (role names for the French stage premiere)	Voice type	Premiere cast, 6 June 1867 Conductor: Charles Constantin
Don Pippo (Don Beltran)	bass	Géraizer
Donna Pantea (Jacinthe), his wife, believed to be dead	soprano	Mathilde
Celidora (Isabelle)	soprano	A. Arnaud
Biondello (Fabrice)	tenor	Laurent
Calandrino, Donna Pantea's nephew, friend of Biondello and lover of Lavina	tenor	
(The eunuch)		Bonnet
Lavina, Celidora's companion	soprano	
Chichibio (Pascal) Don Pippo's major-domo, in love with Auretta	bass (baritone)	Masson
Auretta (Aurette)	soprano	Géraizer

== Synopsis ==
Don Pippo, a Spanish Marquess, keeps his only daughter Celidora locked up in his tower. She is betrothed to Count Lionetto, but her true love is Biondello, a wealthy gentleman. Biondello makes a bet with the Marquis that if he can rescue Celidora from the tower within a year he wins her hand in marriage. He succeeds by having himself smuggled into the tower garden inside a large mechanical goose.

== Noted arias ==
- "Ogni momento dicon le donne" – Chichibio, scene 1
- "Se fosse qui nascoso" – Auretta, scene 1
- "Siano pronte alle gran nozze" – Don Pippo, scene 3

== Recordings ==
- 1991 – Dietrich Fischer-Dieskau (Pippo), Edith Wiens (Celidora), Peter Schreier (Biondello), Douglas Johnson (Calandrino), Pamela Coburn (Lavina), Anton Scharinger (Chichibio), Inga Nielsen (Auretta) – Carl Philipp Emanuel Bach Chamber Orchestra, Peter Schreier – CD Philips Classics. This was recorded in 1991 specifically for the Complete Mozart Edition, a project that Philips had started earlier that year. This recording was placed in Volume 39, paired with the previously recorded Lo sposo deluso.
- 2007 – Lo sposo deluso, L'oca del Cairo and other fragments by W. A. Mozart, with Ann Murray, Marianne Hamre, Graham Smith, Josef Wagner, Marisa Martins, Jeremy Ovenden, Matthias Klink, Silvia Moi, Miljenko Turk, Malin Hartelius and the Camerata Salzburg conducted by Michael Hofstetter. DVD of the live performance at the 2006 Salzburg Festival (Deutsche Grammophon 0734250)
- 2018 – L'oca del Cairo & Lo sposo deluso, Herman Bekaert (baritone), Rolande van der Paal (soprano), Ioan Micu (tenor), Bernard Loonen (tenor), Leonie Schoon (soprano), Gretje Anthoni (soprano), Romain Bischoff (baritone); Kameropera Antwerpen, Hans Rotman; CPO

== Notes ==
=== Sources ===
- Cairns, David (2006). Mozart and his Operas. Berkeley: University of California Press. ISBN 9780520228986.
- Lecomte, Louis-Henry (1912). Histoire des théâtres de Paris: Les Fantaisies-Parisiennes, l'Athénée Le Théâtre Scribe, l'Athénée-Comique (1865–1911) (in French). Paris: H. Daragon.
- Wilder, Victor (1867). L'oie du Caire, opéra-bouffe en deux actes (libretto). Paris; Brussels: Librairie Internationale; A. Lacroix, Verboeckhoven, & C^{e} – via Gallica.
