= Tromb-al-ca-zar, ou Les criminels dramatiques =

Bouffonnerie musicale by Jacques Offenbach

Jacques Offenbach by Nadar, c. 1860s

Tromb-al-ca-zar, ou Les criminels dramatiques is a bouffonnerie musicale in one act of 1856 with music by Jacques Offenbach. The French libretto was by Charles-Désiré Dupeuty and Ernest Bourget. With its dialogue containing plays on words and stage business from contemporary Parisian dramas and operas, it is described by Kracauer as satirizing the romantic bandits of grand opera.

== Background ==
Tromb-al-ca-zar was premiered in the Théâtre des Bouffes-Parisiens, Salle Choiseul in Paris, preceded by two cantatas by Offenbach, Le Berceau and La Paix du monde. Successful numbers such as the bolero for Hortense Schneider and the song about Bayonne ham, made the work popular along with the in-jokes, despite the thin plot; it was revived at the Bouffes-Parisiens for several years afterwards.

As well as "extravagant parodies both of specific more serious musical works", the work pokes fun at the brigand element in romantic opera generally.

After opening at the Bouffes-Parisiens, Schneider made such an impression on Prince Jérôme Bonaparte, cousin of the emperor, that the company was summoned to give a command performance of the piece at his home. Tromb-al-ca-zar was performed in Brussels in September 1858 and in Vienna in March 1862, and mounted in London in English in 1870.

== Roles ==
Roles, voice types, premiere cast
| Role | Voice type | Premiere cast, 3 April 1856, Conductor: Jacques Offenbach |
|---|---|---|
| Ignace | bass | Rubel |
| Beaujolais | tenor | Pradeau |
| Vert-Panné | baritone | Léonce |
| Gigolette | soprano | Hortense Schneider |
Four dancers, actors

== Synopsis ==
The interior of an inn near Saint-Jean-de-Luz

The inn-keeper Ignace bemoans his lot at his isolated inn, with no customers. Having abandoned his cousin Simplette he lives in fear of bandit raids. There is a knock at the door; Beaujolais, an itinerant actor wearing a costume giving him the resemblance of a brigand and pistols on his belt, enters – to escape the rain and the police – theatrically declaiming his fate and all the heroic leads he can play (Don César de Bazan, Satan, Robert le Diable, Marco Spada). When Beaujolais describes to the fearful Ignace his exploits in the neighbouring town the inn-keeper thinks he is a bandit, and as soon as he mentions his "troupe", Ignace is sure he is faced with the notorious Tromb-al-ca-zar, leader of the Trabucayres, but reckons on placating them with a plate of sardines.

Vert-Panné (the supporting actor), Gigolette (principal warbler) and other members of the company now also seek refuge in the inn. They had all been jeered from the stage during a performance the previous night in a neighbouring town, and are now on their way to Bayonne. In a trio they quote from various stage and popular musical works of the day, including Félicien David's chanson "Les Hirondelles" and Auber's opéra comique La sirène. They are about to depart when Ignace calls for help to set the table for dinner. As they accept the invitation to eat, Ignace – aside – recognises in Gigolette his cousin, while she – also aside – recognises Ignace. After singing the praises of ham, they accept kirsch from Ignace, singing a song adapted from Le chalet by Adam.

The players rehearse their next production, with Beaujolais as Trombonne-cazar and Vert-Panné as Astolfio, and Ignace gets more and more agitated over-hearing the bloody-thirsty dialogue, and tries to flee. He is brought back in on the quartet about the legendary Tromb-al-ca-zar and eventually, after pleading for mercy, Ignace is enrolled in the troupe, despite his lack of dancing skill. After numerous puns on the word "Pau" (another stop on the players' tour), the work ends with a reprise of the song in praise of Bayonne ham:
"Eh bon, bon, bon! que le vin est bon! avec le jambon de pif, paf, pif, pouf, de Bayonne!".

== Musical numbers ==
- Overture
- Recitative and aria "Ô rage, ô désespoir!" (Beaujolais)
- Trio "Le crocodile en partant pour la guerre" (Gigolette, Beaujolais, Vert-Panné)
- Trio "Détaillons" (Gigolette, Beaujolais, Vert-Panné)
- Couplets "La gitana, ah! Croyez bien ça, ah!" (Gigolette)
- Trio "Un jambon de Bayonne" (Gigolette, Beaujolais, Vert-Panné)
- Quartet "Un beau jour" (Gigolette, Beaujolais, Ignace, Vert-Panné)
- Introduction, Valse et Reprise du Trio du jambon

== See also ==
- Ah ! Les crocodiles: a children's song derived from the first trio.
