= Croco =

Croco is a common abbreviation of Crocodile (disambiguation).

Croco may refer to

- the River Croco in England
- an animal of the Crocodile species
- a train stop of the French Le Crocodile train signaling
- a variant of the historic name Chrocus
