= Louis Marie Fontan =

French writer (1801–1839)

Louis Marie Fontan (November 4, 1801 – October 10, 1839), a French man of letters, was born in Lorient and died in Thiais.

He began his career as a clerk in a government office, but was dismissed for taking part in a political banquet. At the age of nineteen he went to Paris and began to contribute to the Tablettes and the Album. He was brought to trial for political articles written for the latter paper, but defended himself so energetically that he secured indefinite postponement of his trial.

The offending paper was suppressed for a time, and Fontan produced a collection of political poems, Odes et epîtres, and a number of plays, of which Perkins Warbec (1828), written in collaboration with MM. Halévy and Drouineau, was the most successful. In 1828 the Album was revived, and in it Fontan published a virulent but witty attack on Charles X, entitled Le Mouton enrage (June 10, 1829).

To escape the inevitable prosecution Fontan fled over the frontier, but, finding no safe asylum, he returned to Paris to give himself up to the authorities, and was sentenced to five years' imprisonment and a heavy fine. He was liberated by the revolution of 1830, and his Jeanne la folle, performed in the same year, gained a success due perhaps more to sympathy with the author's political principles than to the merits of the piece itself, a somewhat crude and violent picture of Breton history.

A drama representing the trial of Marshal Ney, which he wrote in collaboration with Charles Dupeuty, Le Proces d'un maréchal de France (printed 1831), was suppressed on the night of its production. Fontan died in Thiais on 10 October 1839.

A sympathetic portrait of Fontan as a prisoner, and an analysis of his principal works, are to be found in Jules Janin's Histoire de la littérature dramatique, volume i, and also in Eugène Briffault's biographical portrait "Fontan" in the collection Nouvelles parisiennes (1843).
