= Théâtre de l'Athénée (rue Scribe) =

Former theatre in Paris, France

Coordinates: 48.87262°N 2.33076°E

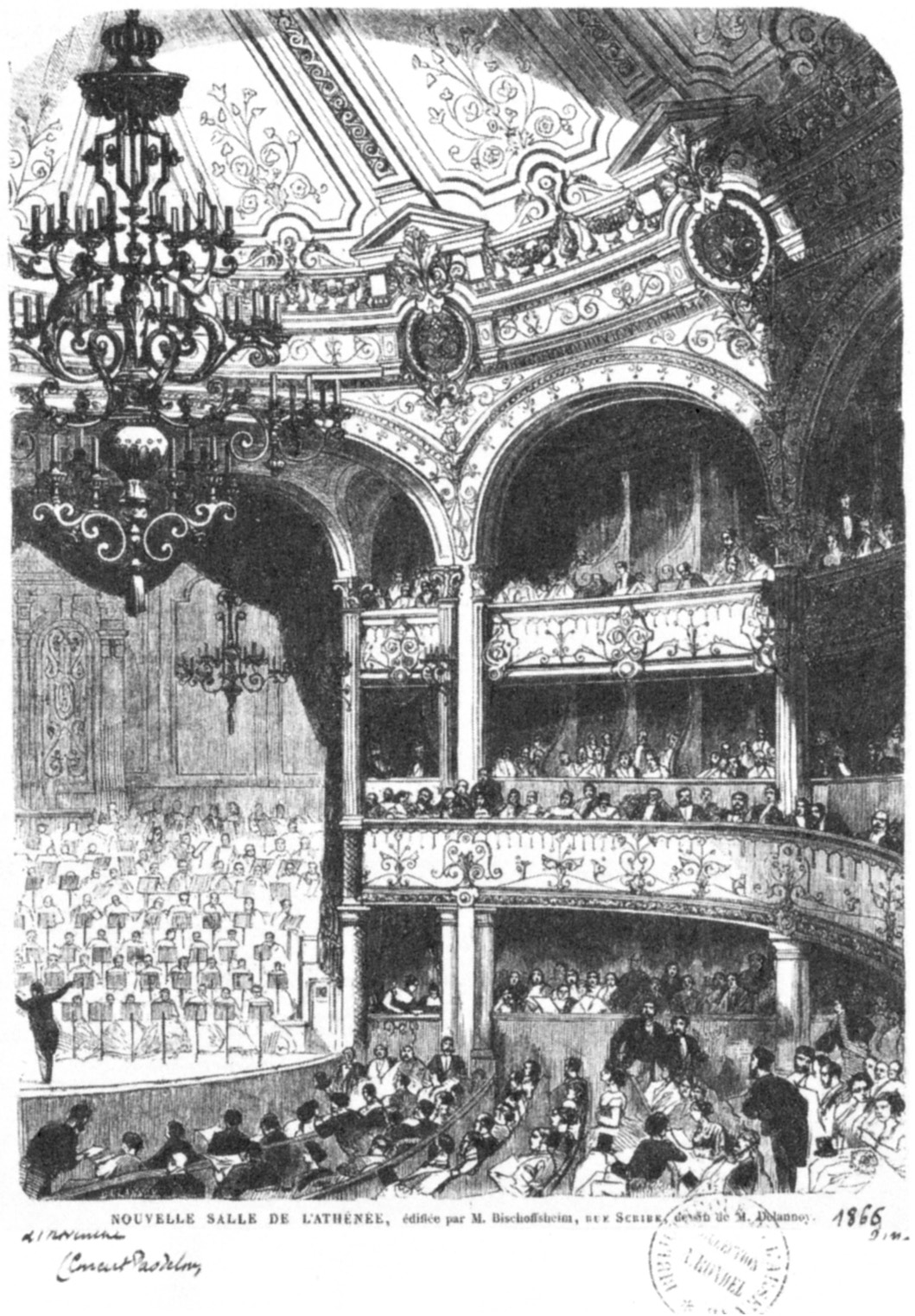
Salle de l'Athénée, 1866

Théâtre de l'Athénée (French pronunciation: [teɑtʁ də latene]) or Salle de l'Athénée (pronounced [sal də latene]) was the name of a theatre in the basement of a building built in 1865 by the banker Bischoffsheim at 17 rue Scribe in the 9th arrondissement of Paris (near the new, but at the time unfinished opera house, now known as the Palais Garnier). The Athénée was initially small, with a capacity of 760 spectators, but was enlarged to 900 places by the addition of a top gallery in 1867. The interior was decorated by Charles Cambon. The venue was used by a variety of companies, including the Théâtre des Fantaisies-Parisiennes (1869), the Théâtre Lyrique (1871–1872), the Théâtre Scribe (1874–1875), and the Athénée-Comique (1876–1883). It closed permanently in 1883.

== History ==
The Athénée was inaugurated on 21 November 1866 with a series of concerts conducted by Jules Pasdeloup. Concerts were generally given on Monday, Wednesday, and Friday, and conferences on Tuesday, Thursday, or Saturday. The concerts were not financially successful, and Bischoffsheim looked for a new tenant. The final concert was given on 31 May 1867.

The venue was next used by a musical theatre company under the name Théâtre de l'Athénée from 13 December 1867 to 13 January 1869. The directors were William Busnach and Léon Sari. Opéras-bouffes, opérettes, and vaudevilles were presented, by composers such as Georges Bizet, Léo Delibes, and Charles Lecocq. The chef d'orchestre was Bernardin.

On 11 February 1869 Louis Martinet transferred his Théâtre des Fantaisies-Parisiennes, formerly in a 350-seat theatre at 26 Boulevard des Italiens, to the larger Athénée. Their conductor, Charles Constantin, also came with them. On 1 April 1869, the company took the theatre's name and began performing as the Théâtre de l'Athénée. On 16 June 1870, when Martinet was appointed head of the Théâtre-Lyrique (on the Place du Châtelet), he decided to close the Athénée.

The Franco-Prussian War and Siege of Paris (1870–71) prevented any of Martinet's productions from being staged at the Théâtre-Lyrique on the Place du Châtelet, and when that theatre was destroyed by fire during the events of the subsequent Paris Commune, he decided to move the company to the Athénée, where they opened on 11 September 1871 under the name Théâtre-Lyrique, with Constantin as the conductor. In March 1872, the name was changed to Théâtre-Lyrique-National. The company's last performance at the Athénée was on 31 May 1872, and Martinet's enterprise declared bankruptcy on 6 June.

On 10 October 1872 Martinet's former secretary, Jules Ruelles, revived performances at the theatre under the name Théâtre de l'Athénée (although some posters give the name as Théâtre Lyrique). Operas and opéras-comiques were performed, and the conductor was again Constantin. This company's final performance was on 3 December 1873.

The theatre reopened on 5 September 1874 as the Théâtre Scribe, under the direction of Noël Martin, who presented plays until 6 February 1875, when Un accroc dans l'dos (an opérette) and La belle Lina (an opérette-bouffe by Paul Avenel and Paul Mahalin with music by Charles Hubans) were performed. The company closed down that month after six performances.

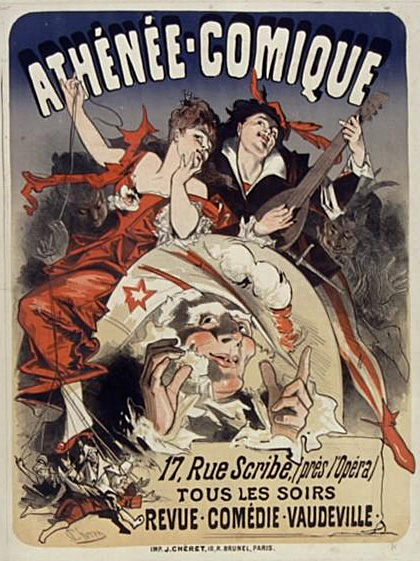
Poster by Jules Chéret (1876)

A more successful company known as the Athénée-Comique, under the direction of Montrouge, performed at the theatre from 4 February 1876 until 31 May 1883. Light comedies, revues, vaudevilles, and opéras-comiques were given. The chef d'orchestre was Louis Varney, whose Il signor Pulcinella was presented there, beginning on 26 September 1876.

The last performance in the theatre was on 31 May 1883, after which the top gallery and the balcony below it were converted into a restaurant, and the orchestra pit became a coal cellar.

== See also ==
- List of former or demolished entertainment venues in Paris

== Bibliography ==
- Chauveau, Philippe (1999). Les théâtres parisiens disparus, 1402–1986. Paris: Éditions de l'Amandier. ISBN 9782907649308.
- Lecomte, Louis-Henry (1912). Histoire des théâtres de Paris: Les Fantaisies-Parisiennes, l'Athénée Le Théâtre Scribe, l'Athénée-Comique (1865-1911). Paris: H. Daragon. Copy at the Internet Archive.
- Walsh, T. J. (1981). Second Empire Opera: The Théâtre Lyrique Paris 1851–1870. New York: Riverrun Press. ISBN 9780714536590.
- Wild, Nicole ([1989]). Dictionnaire des théâtres parisiens au XIXe siècle: les théâtres et la musique. Paris: Aux Amateurs de livres. ISBN 9780828825863. ISBN 9782905053800 (paperback). View formats and editions at WorldCat.
