= Nicolas Chauvin =

Legendary French soldier and patriot

Nicolas Chauvin (/ˈʃoʊvɪn/, French: [ʃovɛ̃]) is a legendary, possibly apocryphal or fictional French soldier and patriot who is supposed to have served in the First Army of the French Republic and later in La Grande Armée of Napoleon. His name is the eponym of chauvinism, originally a term for excessive nationalistic fervor, but later used to refer to any form of bigotry or bias (e.g., male chauvinism).

According to the stories that developed about him, Chauvin was born in Rochefort around 1780. He enlisted at age 18, and he served honorably and well. He is said to have been wounded 17 times in his nation's service, resulting in his severe disfigurement and maiming. For his loyalty and dedication, Napoleon himself presented the soldier with a Sabre of Honor and a pension of 200 francs.

Chauvin's distinguished record of service and his love and devotion for Napoleon, which endured despite the price he willingly paid for them, is said to have earned him only ridicule and derision in Restoration France, when Bonapartism became increasingly unpopular.

== Historicity ==
Historical research has not identified any biographical details of a real Nicolas Chauvin, leading to the claim that he may have been a wholly fictional figure. Researcher Gérard Puymège concluded that Nicolas Chauvin did not exist, believing him to be a legend, which crystallized under the Restoration and July Monarchy, from the pen of songwriters, vaudeville and historians. He argues that the figure of Chauvin continues the long tradition of the mythological farmer-soldier or miles gloriosus ("boastful soldier") from ancient Roman theater, or the alazon of ancient Greek comedy. Chauvin was originally popularized by Cogniard brothers' The Tricolour Cockade (1831), where instead of a Napoleonic veteran he was a young naive soldier learning blindly aggressive patriotism during the Algerian campaign of 1830.

When the Old Guard was surrounded and made its last stand at La Belle Alliance, he supposedly shouted in defiance to a call for their honorable surrender: "The Old Guard dies but does not surrender!", implying blind and unquestioned zealous devotion to one's country (or other group of reference). The apocryphal phrase was attributed to the Old Guard's commander, Pierre Cambronne, but Cambronne's actual reply was later asserted by other sources to be "Merde!" ("Shit!").

== See also ==
- Lei Feng
