= Louis Martinet =

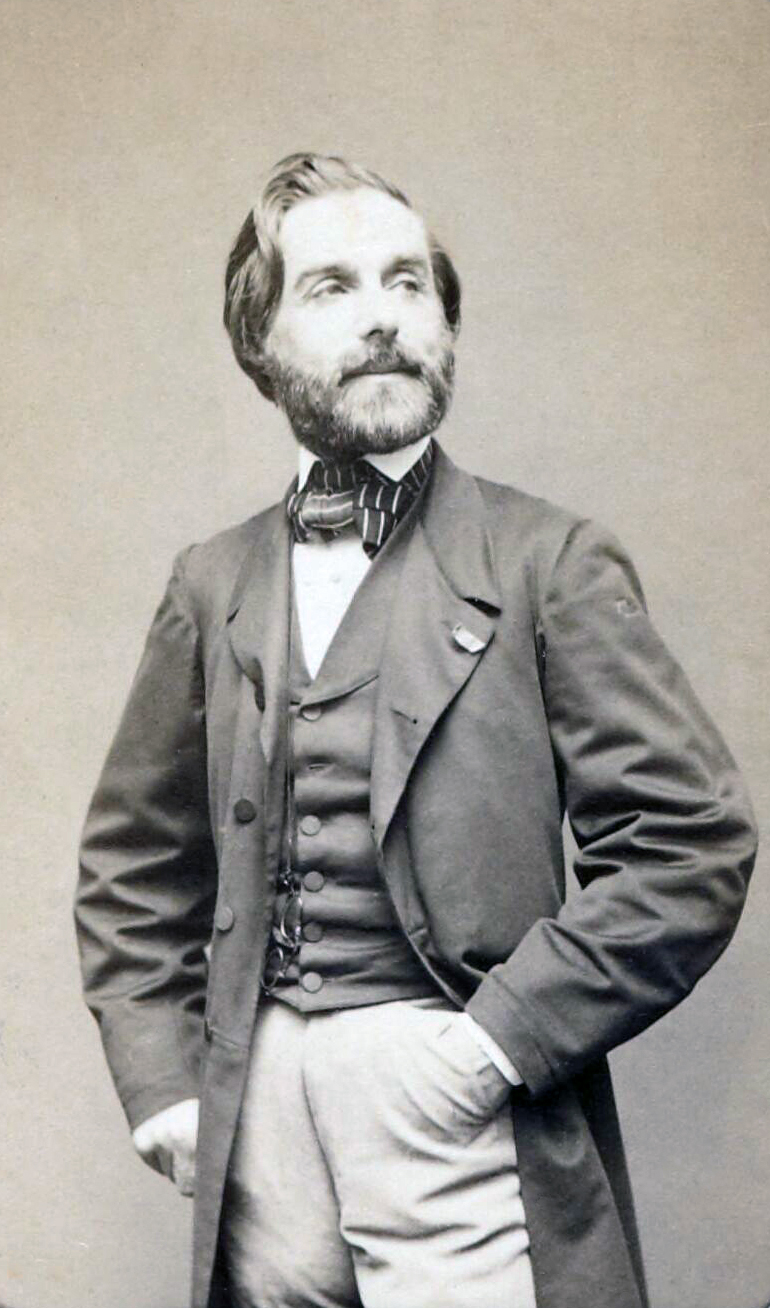
Louis Martinet

Louis Martinet (1814 – before 8 January 1895) was a French painter, gallery owner and theater director.

== Painter, art dealer and gallery owner ==
Louis Martinet was born in Paris and studied painting at the École des Beaux-Arts in the studio of Baron Gros. He began a career as a painter, but was forced to give it up due to an eye disease. In 1849, he began as an inspector in the administration of the fine arts where, until 1855, he was in charge of the organization of the Salons. In conflict with his management, he resigned in 1857 and became an artistic agent for major collectors, such as Charles de Morny, Duke of Morny.

In 1859, he joined forces with the art dealer François Petit, son of Georges Petit, to organize a retrospective of the work of the painter Ary Scheffer for the benefit of a relief fund for an association of artists. The exhibition took place in a gallery built in the garden of the Marquis of Hertford, at 26 Boulevard des Italiens in Paris. In 1860, they again organized two exhibitions there, one of contemporary art, competing with the Salon, the other on French painting of the 18th century, organized by Philippe Burty, in which more than 40 paintings by Jean-Baptiste-Siméon Chardin were presented. In conjunction with the art dealer Durand-Ruel, the gallery published a ten-volume album of photographs of contemporary art.

In 1861, Louis Martinet took over the management of the gallery alone, which he transformed into a permanent exhibition, the entrance fee to which covered costs, no commission being deducted from the sale of the works exhibited. The same year, he founded Le Courrier Artistique, a weekly magazine on artistic news, then created, with Théophile Gautier, the Société Nationale des Beaux-Arts, which brought together more than 200 painters and sculptors, whose "principle is the right of copyright in painting, — the legitimate and fair profit that the artist must be able to draw from the exposure that is made of his work" with the aim of "making artists independent and teaching them to do their own business".

The Gallery Martinet notably exhibited works by Jean-François Millet, Jules Dupré, and Théodore Rousseau, as well as other artists, including James McNeill Whistler, Pierre Puvis de Chavannes, Gustave Courbet (1863), and Honoré Daumier. In May 1862, Edmond and Jules de Goncourt visited, to see Jesus Among the Doctors by Ingres, which was hanging among other paintings by Delacroix, Flandrin, Fantin-Latour and Carolus-Duran. Édouard Manet had his first personal exhibition there in 1863. There was a notable exhibition of paintings by the recently deceased Delacroix in 1864.

Supporter of a project of total artistic experience and fusion of the arts, Martinet also broadened the activities of his gallery by installing a small concert room and holding recitals there, at first sporadically, but later daily, organized by the singer Gustave Roger and the conductor and composer Jean-Jacques Debillemont. Concerts included music by Hector Berlioz, Félicien David, Georges Bizet and Camille Saint-Saëns. Readings and conferences, were given by men of letters like Alexandre Dumas fils and Théophile Gautier.

== Theater director ==
The gallery was struggling to find its audience and failed to achieve an economic balance. It ceased its activities in 1865 and was converted into a theater, the Théâtre des Fantaisies-Parisiennes, whose direction was first undertaken, on 3 November 1865, by Jules Champfleury. The latter was succeeded by Alphonse Duval on 20 December 1865, then Martinet himself on 21 November 1866. During the Exhibition of 1867, when good audiences were assured, he produced a version of Mozart's L'Oca del Cairo, orchestrated by Charles Constantin, with three other pieces by Mozart added by the translator, Victor Wilder. In February 1869, Martinet transferred the company to the Théâtre de l'Athénée on the rue Scribe. It was reported that he lost his lease to the site on the Boulevard des Italiens and had been ordered to clear it by 1 April. Apparently the building remained, however, since in 1876 it became the Fantaisies-Oller, but was later demolished before the construction of the new Théâtre des Nouveautés which opened on 12 June 1878.

Martinet became director of the Théâtre Lyrique on 1 July 1870. That company's theater on the Place du Châtelet was destroyed by fire on 25 May 1871, during the final week of the Paris Commune, after which Martinet moved the company to the Théâtre de l'Athénée on the rue Scribe, where it reopened on 11 September 1871 and continued to perform until 31 May 1872. Martinet declared the enterprise bankrupt on 6 June 1872, after which the rights were acquired by Jules Ruelle, who reopened it as the Théâtre de l'Athénée on 10 October 1872.

Martinet was a director of the Opéra Populaire at the Théâtre de la Gaîté from 27 October 1879 to February 1880.

== Bibliography ==
- Jensen, Robert (1994). Marketing Modernism in Fin-de-Siècle Europe. Princeton, New Jersey: Princeton University Press. ISBN 9780691241951.
- Walsh, T. J. (1981). Second Empire Opera: The Théâtre Lyrique Paris 1851–1870. New York: Riverrun Press. ISBN 9780714536590.
- Weisberg, Gabriel P. (1979). Chardin and the Still-life Tradition in France. Indiana University Press. ISBN 9780910386517.
- Wild, Nicole (2012). Dictionnaire des théâtres parisiens (1807–1914). Lyon: Symétrie. ISBN 9782914373487. OCLC 826926792.
