= The Tricolour Cockade =

1831 play

- Original language: French
- Written by: Cogniard Brothers
- Genre: Comedy
- Setting: Algeria, Present day

Premiere
- Date: 19 March 1831
- Place: Théâtre des Folies-Dramatiques, Paris

The Tricolour Cockade (French: La cocarde tricolore) is an 1831 French comedy play by the Cogniard Brothers. A Vaudeville, it premiered at the Théâtre des Folies-Dramatiques in Paris on 19 March 1831 and concerned the ongoing French conquest of Algeria. A veteran of the Napoleonic Wars is due to be executed by firing squad during the Bourbon Restoration for wearing a tricolour cockade once presented to him by Napoleon but is saved by the outbreak of the July Revolution in Paris. The unit are than given their chance to display their heroism in battle against the Algerians.

The play is best known for the character of Nicolas Chauvin, an ultra-patriotic young soldier who continues to idolise the deposed French Emperor Napoleon long after his defeat, abdication and death, who gave his name to the concept of chauvinism. In addition another noted character Dumanet, a ridiculous and boastful figure, also appeared.

== Bibliography ==
- Campbell, Lyle. Historical Linguistics, fourth edition: An Introduction. MIT Press, 2021.
- Sessions, Jennifer E. By Sword and Plow: France and the Conquest of Algeria. Cornell University Press, 2015.
