= Charles Constantin (conductor) =

French conductor and composer

Titus-Charles Constantin (7 January 1835 – 27 October 1891) was a French conductor, violinist and composer.

== Career ==
Born in Marseille, Constantin studied at the Paris Conservatoire, entering the composition class of Ambroise Thomas in June 1858. His compositions include cantatas, a ballet and several orchestral works.

But Constantin was better known as a conductor. He was music director of Louis Martinet's Théâtre des Fantaisies-Parisiennes from 1865 where he revived rare operas by Schubert, Donizetti, Weber, Hérold, Monsigny and Philidor. He also completed and conducted the stage premiere of Mozart's L'Oca del Cairo (as L'Oie de Caire) on 6 June 1867 at the Théâtre des Fantaisies-Parisiennes; his version was later revived elsewhere. In 1871–1872 he was conductor of the Théâtre Lyrique, when that company was being managed by Martinet and performing at the Théâtre de l'Athénée on rue Scribe.

Constantin was then engaged by Daudé as musical director at the Casino in Rue Cadet from September 1871. He conducted the orchestra in the premier run of L'Arlésienne by Alphonse Daudet with incidental music by Bizet. Constantin also directed the orchestra at the Théâtre de la Renaissance from March 1873 and was music director at the Paris Opéra-Comique from the death of Adolphe Deloffre until September 1876.

In the 1870s he conducted at the Théâtre du Capitole de Toulouse and at the Teatro Nacional de São Carlos in Lisbon. His later career was centred on Royan and Pau, where he died.
