= Chauvinism =

Belief in the superiority of one's own group

Chauvinism (/ˈʃoʊvɪˌnɪzəm/ SHOH-vih-niz-əm) is the unreasonable belief in the superiority or dominance of one's own group or people, who are seen as strong and virtuous, while others are considered weak, unworthy, or inferior. The Encyclopaedia Britannica describes it as a form of "excessive and unreasonable" patriotism and nationalism, a fervent faith in national excellence and glory.

In American English, since the 1940s, the word has increasingly been used as a shorthand for male chauvinism, a trend reflected in Merriam-Webster's Dictionary, which, as of 2018, began its first example of use of the term chauvinism with "an attitude of superiority toward members of the opposite sex".

== As ultranationalism ==
According to legend, French soldier Nicolas Chauvin was seriously wounded in the Napoleonic Wars and received a meager pension for his injuries. After Napoleon abdicated, Chauvin maintained his fanatical Bonapartist belief in the messianic mission of Imperial France, despite the unpopularity of this view under the Bourbon Restoration. His single-minded devotion to his cause, despite neglect by his faction and harassment by its enemies, started the use of the term. The French term had originated in the early 1830s based on the character of Nicolas Chauvin in the play The Tricolour Cockade by the Cogniard Brothers, and was later adopted into English, being recorded in American English in 1867.

Chauvinism has extended from its original use to include fanatical devotion and undue partiality to any group or cause to which one belongs, especially when such partisanship includes prejudice against or hostility toward outsiders or rival groups and persists even in the face of overwhelming opposition. This French quality finds its parallel in the English-language term jingoism, which has retained the meaning of chauvinism strictly in its original sense; that is, an attitude of belligerent nationalism.

In 1945, political theorist Hannah Arendt described the concept thus:

Chauvinism is an almost natural product of the national concept in so far as it springs directly from the old idea of the "national mission". ... [A] nation's mission might be interpreted precisely as bringing its light to other, less fortunate peoples that, for whatever reason, have miraculously been left by history without a national mission. As long as this concept did not develop into the ideology of chauvinism and remained in the rather vague realm of national or even nationalistic pride, it frequently resulted in a high sense of responsibility for the welfare of backward people.

In this sense, chauvinism is irrational, in that no one can claim their nation or ethnic group to be inherently superior to another.

A historical example of chauvinism from the century following Chauvin was the German-Jewish poet Ernst Lissauer, whose extreme nationalism after the outbreak of World War I included writing the "Hymn of Hate against England" ("Haßgesang gegen England") in 1915. As David Aberbach remarks, "There is nothing in modern Hebrew literature, however devoted to the cause of Jewish sovereignty, remotely comparable to the super-chauvinistic Hassgesang ('Hate Song for England')..."

Despite chauvinism's irrational roots, at the time, it was explicitly seen as almost obligatory for any German patriot. As Walther Rathenau commented just prior to the outbreak of the war, "Whoever loves his Fatherland may and should be something of a chauvinist." Lissauer's poem was exceedingly popular, to the extent that it was praised by the Kaiser himself, and Lissauer's slogan "Gott strafe England" (lit. 'May God punish England') was used as a daily greeting. However, whilst some German Jews did take the opportunity of the war to demonstrate their patriotism, Lissauer was an extremist, and in contrast many other German Jews disagreed with Lissauer and the way that mainstream opinion had shifted.

The Christianity-centric imagery used to document the Kriegserlebnis by authors such as Walter Flex alienated Jewish soldiers. Whereas Lissauer attempted to sign up as a soldier (but was rejected as unfit) as soon as war broke out, then penned the poem, and in the words of Stefan Zweig considered everything published by the German newspapers and army to be "gospel truth" and Edward Grey to be "the worst criminal". The last lines of the poem read:

We love as one, we hate as one,
We have one foe and one alone —
ENGLAND!

== Male chauvinism ==
Male chauvinism is the belief that men are superior to women. The closely related terms are male supremacy, male oppression, and patriarchy.

=== History ===
While the first variation of the English term chauvinism, "literary chauvinism", appeared in 1888, the growing popularity of variations is attributed to the American Communist Party that stressed the "white chauvinism" and "male chauvinism" in the early 1930s ("white chauvinism" dates back to the "Resolution on the Negro Question" of 1930). At this time the brief term "chauvinism" frequently was used to designate the white chauvinism. The term "male sex chauvinism" appeared in The New York Times in 1934, while the form "male chauvinism" is first documented in the 1935 Clifford Odets play Till the Day I Die to reflect a pattern of patronizingly claiming the superiority of males, "You and your male chauvinism!". Outside the Communist party, the term was very rarely used for the next 30 years (about one mention in NYT every three years). At the same time, the "male chauvinism" term was regularly used in the Communist press in the US, with the "chauvinism" now standing for both white chauvinism and male chauvinism. The party sanctions against male chauvinists were employed, but were less severe than the ones against white chauvinists.

The second coming of the male chauvinist term in 1969 is associated with the women's liberation movement. This time it became widespread (130 articles in NYT used the term in 1972 alone). "Male chauvinist pig" quickly followed in 1970 and, useful for teasing and impossible for the target to interpret it as a joke, it turned out easier for activists to adopt, becoming a vogue word or even an early meme (the rate of its spread can be compared to that of "groovy").

By the early 1990s 63% of Chicago women acknowledged calling someone a "male chauvinist pig", including 58% of the women who did not self-identify as feminists, 56% of conservatives, 60% of non-voters, and 51% of African Americans. For comparison, much fewer women at the time used the word "sexist". The phrase was spreading through both everyday talk and the mass media.

=== In the workplace ===
The balance of the workforce changed during World War II. As men entered or were conscripted into the military to fight in the war, women started replacing them. After the war ended, men returned home to find jobs in the workplace now occupied by women, which "threatened the self-esteem many men derive from their dominance over women in the family, the economy, and society at large." Consequently, male chauvinism was on the rise, according to Cynthia B. Lloyd.

Lloyd and Michael Korda have argued that as they integrated back into the workforce, men returned to predominate, holding positions of power while women worked as their secretaries, usually typing dictations and answering telephone calls. This division of labor was understood and expected, and women typically felt unable to challenge their position or male superiors, argue Korda and Lloyd.

=== Causes ===
Chauvinist assumptions are seen by some as a bias in the TAT psychological personality test. Through cross-examinations, the TAT exhibits a tendency toward chauvinistic stimuli for its questions and has the "potential for unfavorable clinical evaluation" for women.

An often cited study done in 1976 by Sherwyn Woods, "Some Dynamics of Male Chauvinism", attempts to find the underlying causes of male chauvinism.

Male chauvinism was studied in the psychoanalytic therapy of 11 men. It refers to the maintenance of fixed beliefs and attitudes of male superiority, associated with overt or covert depreciation of women. Challenging chauvinist attitudes often results in anxiety or other symptoms. It is frequently not investigated in psychotherapy because it is ego-syntonic, parallels cultural attitudes, and because therapists often share similar bias or neurotic conflict. Chauvinism was found to represent an attempt to ward off anxiety and shame arising from one or more of four prime sources: unresolved infantile strivings and regressive wishes, hostile envy of women, oedipal anxiety, and power and dependency conflicts related to masculine self-esteem. Mothers were more important than fathers in the development of male chauvinism, and resolution was sometimes associated with decompensation in wives.

Adam Jukes argues that a reason for male chauvinism is masculinity itself:

For the vast majority of people all over the world, the mother is a primary carer...There's an asymmetry in the development of boys and girls. Infant boys have to learn how to be masculine. Girls don't. Masculinity is not in a state of crisis. Masculinity is a crisis. I don't believe misogyny is innate, but I believe it's inescapable because of the development of masculinity.

== Female chauvinism ==
Female chauvinism is the belief that women are superior to men. Second-wave feminist Betty Friedan observed that "...the assumption that women have any moral or spiritual superiority as a class is [...] female chauvinism." Ariel Levy used the term in her book Female Chauvinist Pigs, in which she argues that many young women in the United States and beyond are replicating male chauvinism and older misogynist stereotypes.

== See also ==
- American exceptionalism
- Blind nationalism
- Carbon chauvinism
- Great Russian chauvinism
- Han chauvinism
- Identity politics
- Moral hazard
- Planetary chauvinism
- Sexism
- Social chauvinism
- Supremacism
- Welfare chauvinism
- White nationalism
- White supremacy
