= Paul Henrion =

French composer

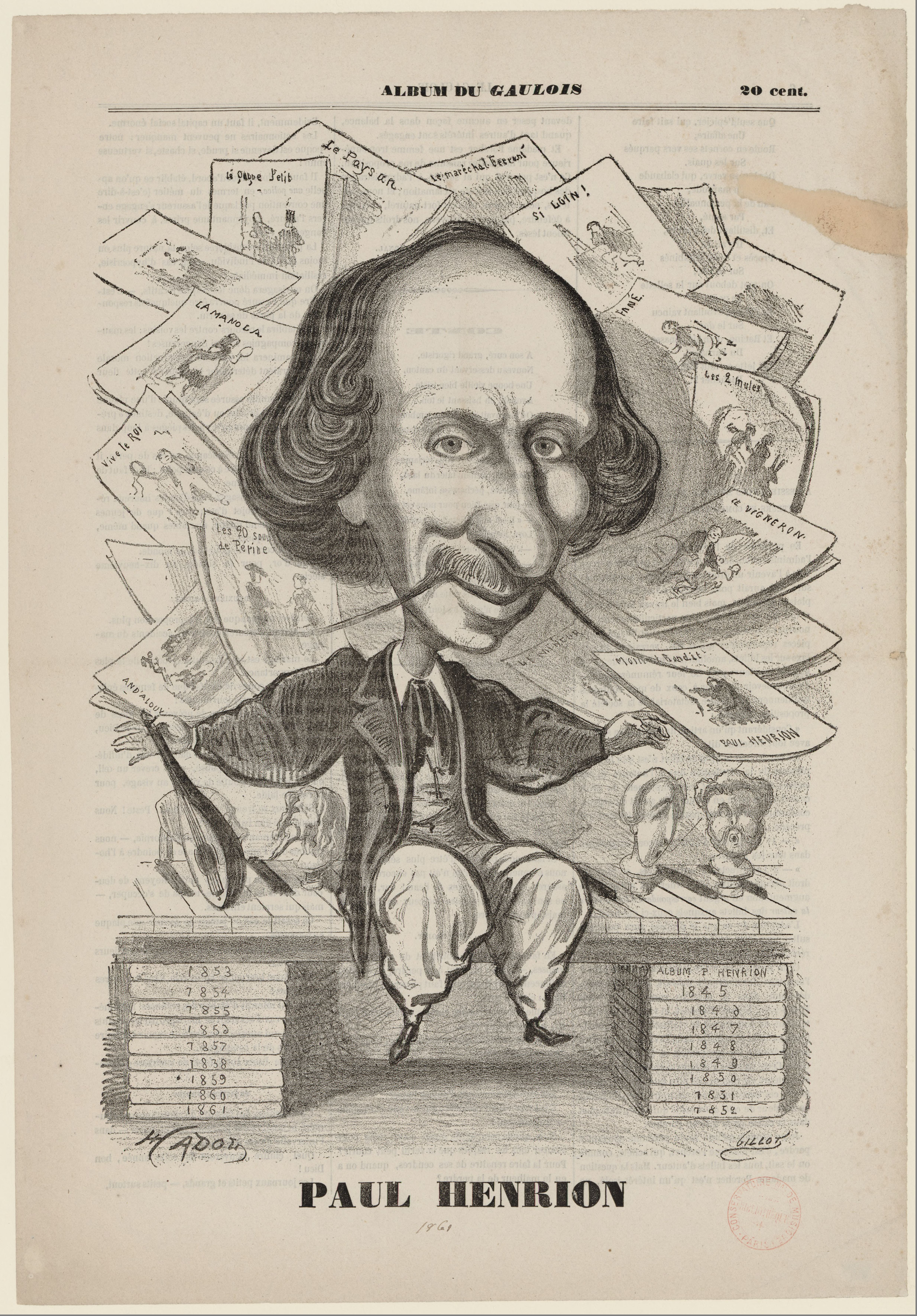
- Paul Henrion by Firmin Gillot, after a charge by Paul Hadol, 1861
- Born: 6 June 1817; Paris
- Died: 24 October 1901 (aged 84); Paris
- Occupation: Composer

Paul Henrion (23 June 1817 – 24 October 1901) was a 19th-century French composer.

President of the Société des auteurs, compositeurs et éditeurs de musique of which he was a co-founder with Victor Parizot and Ernest Bourget, he was also a goguettier, member of the goguette du Poulet sauté. In a panorama of the world of songs published in 1882 in Le Figaro, the journalist considered him "a first-rate artist whose romances for salons were famous". Henrion sometimes signed his compositions under the pseudonym Henri Charlemagne.
