= Ernest Bourget =

French playwright, lyricist and librettist (1814–1864)

Ernest Alexandre Joseph Bourget (10 March 1814 – 2 October 1864 in Thomery, Seine-et-Oise aged 50) was a 19th-century French playwright, lyricist and librettist. In 1847 at the Café des Ambassadeurs, Paul Henrion, Victor Parizot and Ernest Bourget refused to pay the bill as long as they would not receive anything from the performance of their works in the facility. The ensuing trial would mark the creation of the SACEM.

According to recent research it was not this legendary event that Bourget took to trial. The contemporary journal ‘Le Droit‘ tells another story. M. Bourget was refused the drink he ordered at another establishment: the Café Morel. In the evenings the proprietor, M. Morel, served only guests who ordered drinks for which the garçon could not ‘deceive the corkscrew’. The profit from a modest eau sucré was ‘too small a thing for the proprietor to be able to present music and seats through a whole evening’. Bourget was annoyed and sued M. Morel who, after two trials in Tribunal de Commerce de la Seine and one in Cour d’Appel de Paris, had been sentenced to pay a total of 800 francs. The verdicts established that the transaction costs for a systematic collection of performing right fees could be covered by amounts claimed at a level which was related to the indemnity decided on by the Parisian courts of justice. Hence, on 18 March 1850 Ernest Bourget, Victor Parizot and Paul Henrion, aided by the publisher Jules Colombier, started a mutual collecting society which later became known as La Société des Auteurs, Compositeurs et Éditeurs de Musique (SACEM).

Ernest Bourget is the author or co-author of several librettos for Jacques Offenbach.

== Works ==
=== Librettos ===
- 1856: Tromb-al-ca-zar, ou Les criminels dramatiques, music by Jacques Offenbach, libretto with Charles Dupeuty
- 1856: Les Dragées du baptême, music by Jacques Offenbach, libretto with Charles Dupeuty
- 1857: Les Deux Pêcheurs ou le Lever du soleil, music by Jacques Offenbach, libretto with Charles Dupeuty
- 1857: Les Chansons populaires de la France, music by Alphonse Varney
- 1860: Bibi Bambou, melody by Jacques Offenbach, poem by Ernest Bourget
- 1867: La Leçon de chant électro-magnétique, music by Jacques Offenbach

=== Songs ===
- 1841: Les Dîners parisiens, music by Victor Parizot
- 1845: La Mère Michel aux Italiens, music by Victor Parizot
- 1855: Le Sire de Framboisy ou Le Sire de Franc-Boisy (1855), music by Laurent de Rillé, lyrics by Bourget, ed. Meissonier fils, performed by Joseph Kelm at Théâtre des Folies-Nouvelles
- 1855: Le Vigneron, music by Paul Henrion
- 1855: À bas la crinoline, music by Edmond Lhuillier
- 1859: Végétal, animal et minéral, music by Charles-François Plantade
- 186?: Les Canotiers, music by A. Marquerie

=== Bibliography ===
- Chantal Brunschwig, Louis-Jean Calvet, Jean-Claude Klein, Cent ans de chanson française, Seuil, 1972 (1re éd. reliée); ré-éd. poche (coll. Points actuels), 1981 ISBN 2-02-00-2915-4
- Christian Goubault, « Ernest Bourget » in Dictionnaire de la musique en France au XIXe siècle, Joël-Marie Fauquet (dir.), Fayard, Paris, 2003 ISBN 2-213-59316-7
