= Crocodile River =

Crocodile River

- Crocodile River (Limpopo), river in the north of South Africa, tributary of the Limpopo River
- Crocodile River (Mpumalanga), river in the northeast of South Africa, tributary of the Komati River
- Crocodile River (Minnesota), river in Minnesota
