= Ah! Les crocodiles =

French children's song

Ah ! Les crocodiles is a popular children's song in France. The song has been around since at least 1860 and relates the adventures of an Egyptian crocodile going to war against Elephants.

This nineteenth-century nursery rhyme is derived from Jacques Offenbach's song Hooray for the Crocodile, part of the Tromb-al-ca-zar ou les Criminels dramatiques, premiered in April 1856.
