= Crocodilefish =

Crocodilefish may refer to:

- Butis butis (Hamilton, 1822), the crazy fish, a sleeper goby found in marine, brackish, and freshwater habitats along the Indian Ocean and western Pacific.
- Cymbacephalus beauforti (Knapp, 1973), the De Beaufort's flathead, reef-associated, a fish occurring in the western Pacific.
- Papilloculiceps longiceps (Cuvier, 1829), the tentacled flathead, reef-associated, a fish occurring in the western Indian Ocean. Also known as the Indian Ocean crocodilefish.
- Satyrichthys lingi (Whitley, 1933), Ling's armour gurnard, a fish occurring on the continental slope of Australia.
- Atractosteus spatula (Lacépède, 1803), Alligator gar, North American freshwater fish.
