= SACEM =

French professional association

The logo of SACEM introduced in 2025.

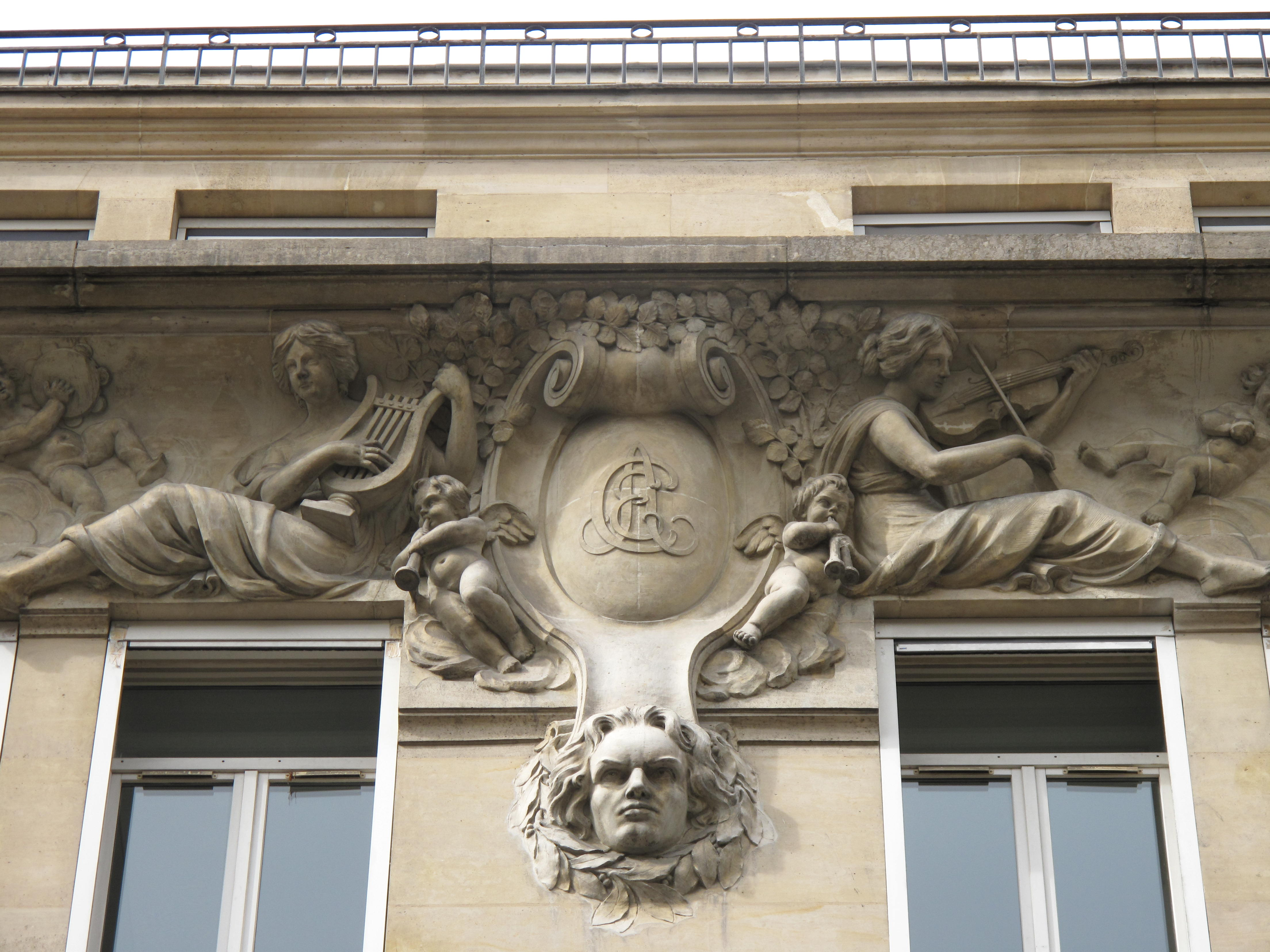
Façade of 10 Rue Chaptal, first home of SACEM

The Society of Authors, Composers and Publishers of Music (Note: French: Société des auteurs, compositeurs et éditeurs de musique.) or SACEM (French pronunciation: [sasɛm]) is a French professional association collecting payments of artists’ rights and distributing the rights to the original songwriters, composers, and music publishers. Founded in 1851, it is a non-profit non-trading entity owned and managed by its members according to the business model of a cooperative.

== History ==
The logo used before 2025.

Composers Ernest Bourget, Victor Parizot and Paul Henrion in Paris in 1847 (see 1847 in music) succeeded in having payment made for their works which were being played in the leading concert-café at the time, Café des Ambassadeurs. The French courts recognized these legitimate rights founded in revolutionary laws. The provisional union of authors, composers and publishers of music was thus established in 1850, and one year later, the professional union became a society (société civile) of authors, composers, and publishers who divided the author's rights collected amongst the members, and this rule has been maintained to the present day.

SACEM first had 350 members when it was founded in the 1850s, distributed between authors, composers and publishers of music. This period was marked by the start of the urban revolution, the growth of metropolises and the progression and multiplication of café-concerts. A century after SACEM's foundation, the number of its members was multiplied by 170. In 1963, SACEM developed cultural action to aid musical creation, the dissemination of works and integration of young professionals. Every year, over a million works are registered with SACEM.

== Grands Prix Sacem ==
Every year, following a vote by the Board of Directors, the Grands Prix Sacem are awarded to authors, authors-directors, composers and music publishers who are members of Sacem. Since 2006, the ceremony celebrates outstanding contributions in songwriting, music publishing, classical contemporary music and humor.
