= Crocodile (song) =

Single by Underworld

from the album Oblivion with Bells
- Released: September 12, 2007
- Label: underworldlive.com, Traffic
- Songwriters: Rick Smith, Karl Hyde
- Producer: Rick Smith

Underworld singles chronology
"Peggy Sussed" (2006)	"Crocodile" (2007)	"Boy, Boy, Boy" (2007)

"Crocodile" is a song by British electronic music band Underworld, and was released as a single on September 12, 2007, in Japan first, in order to promote their album Oblivion with Bells. On September 5, Underworld released the music video for "Crocodile" on their website. This song, as well as its Oliver Huntemann Remix, is featured in the game FIFA Street 3. The single peaked on the UK Singles Chart at number 93.

== Track listing ==
=== CD: underworldlive.com, UWR000193 (UK) ===
1. "Crocodile" (radio edit) – 3:52
2. "Crocodile" (Pete Heller Remix) – 7:33
3. "Peach Tree" – 12:35

=== CD: Traffic, TRCP13 (JP) ===
1. "Crocodile" (radio edit) – 3:52
2. "Crocodile" (Pete Heller Remix) – 7:33
3. "Crocodile" (Oliver Huntemann Remix) – 8:35
4. "Crocodile" (Oliver Huntemann Dub) – 7:26

=== CD: underworldlive.com, (UK/US) promo ===
1. "Crocodile" (LP version) – 8:58
2. "Crocodile" (single edit) – 3:52
3. "Crocodile" (Pete Heller Remix) – 7:33
4. "Crocodile" (Oliver Huntemann Remix) – 8:35
5. "Crocodile" (Oliver Huntemann Dub) – 7:26

=== CD: underworldlive.com, (UK) promo ===
1. "Crocodile" (LP version) – 8:58
2. "Crocodile" (single edit) – 3:52
3. "Crocodile" (Pete Heller Remix) – 7:33
4. "Crocodile" (Pete Heller Dub) – 7:27
5. "Crocodile" (Oliver Huntemann Remix) – 8:35
6. "Crocodile" (Oliver Huntemann Dub) – 7:26
7. "Crocodile" (Innervisions Orchestra Remix) – 10:27

=== CD: underworldlive.com, (UK) promo ===
1. "Crocodile" (LP version) – 8:58
2. "Crocodile" (single edit) – 3:52
3. "Crocodile" (Pete Heller Remix) – 7:33
4. "Crocodile" (Innervisions Orchestra Remix) – 10:27

=== CD: PIAS, (AU) promo ===
1. "Crocodile" (single edit) – 3:52

=== CD: Traffic, TRPCD-1 (JP) promo ===
1. "Crocodile" (single edit) – 3:52

=== 12": underworldlive.com, UWR-000019-4 (UK) ===
1. "Crocodile" (album version) – 8:58
2. "Crocodile" (Oliver Huntemann Remix) – 8:35

=== 12": underworldlive.com, UWR-000019-4A (UK) ===
1. "Crocodile" (Pete Heller Remix) – 7:33
2. "Crocodile" (Innervisions Orchestra Remix) – 10:27

The version of "Crocodile" on Oblivion with Bells has a duration of 6:30 and segues into "Beautiful Burnout". The "LP version" or "Album version" on these releases have an extra two minutes of looped outro.

== Charts ==
Chart (2007)	Peak position
Belgium (Ultratip Bubbling Under Flanders)	15
UK Singles (Official Charts)	93
UK Indie (Official Charts)	1
