= Cogniard brothers =

French playwrights and theatre directors

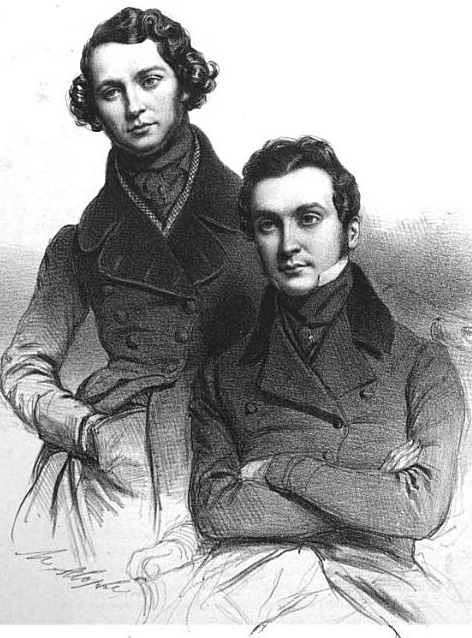
The Cogniard brothers circa 1839

The Cogniard brothers were two French brothers who worked as playwrights and theatre directors, producing an incalculable number of vaudevilles, reviews, féeries and operettas. The elder of the two was Charles-Théodore or Théodore Cogniard (30 April 1806 – 13 May 1872) and the younger was Jean-Hippolyte or Hippolyte Cogniard (28 November 1807 – 6 February 1882). Both brothers were born and died in Paris.

== Career ==
Nicknamed "les jumeaux siamois du vaudeville" (the Siamese twins of vaudeville), they headed the Théâtre de la Porte-Saint-Martin from 1840 to 1845. In 1845, Hippolyte took sole charge of the Théâtre du Vaudeville, then of the Théâtre des Variétés from 1854 to 1869, where he instituted a repertoire solely consisting of operettas. It was under Hippolyte's leadership that Jacques Offenbach created his best-known works: La Belle Hélène, Barbe-Bleue, La Grande-Duchesse de Gérolstein and La Périchole. In 1869, on behalf of his son Léon, Hippolyte acquired the Cirque-Impérial and renamed it the Théâtre du Château d'Eau, after its proximity to the Place du Château d'Eau (now Place de la République). He then took it over after his son's premature death in March 1870. (After several failures, in 1904 that theatre became one of the most famous Parisian music halls, as the Alhambra.)

As playwrights, the Cogniard brothers produced an impressive number of plays, fééries and reviews from 1830 onwards, collaborating with Hector Crémieux, Louis-François Clairville and Paul Siraudin. These included The Tricolour Cockade, La Révolte des modistes, Les Deux Borgnes, L'Agnès de Belleville (with Paul de Kock), Bobêche et Galimafré, La Fille de l'air, Les Enfants du délire, Le Naufrage de la Méduse, Les Mille et une nuits, La Biche aux bois, La Cornemuse du diable, Le Royaume du calembourg, La Poudre de perlimpinpin, Le Monde camelotte, Les Bibelots du diable, La Grande Marée, Sans queue ni tête (with Crémieux), La Reine Crinoline ou Le royaume des femmes, Les Compagnons de la truelle (with Clairville), Les Bêtises d'hier (with Clairville and Siraudin) and their greatest success, La Chatte blanche (a féerie put on in 1852).

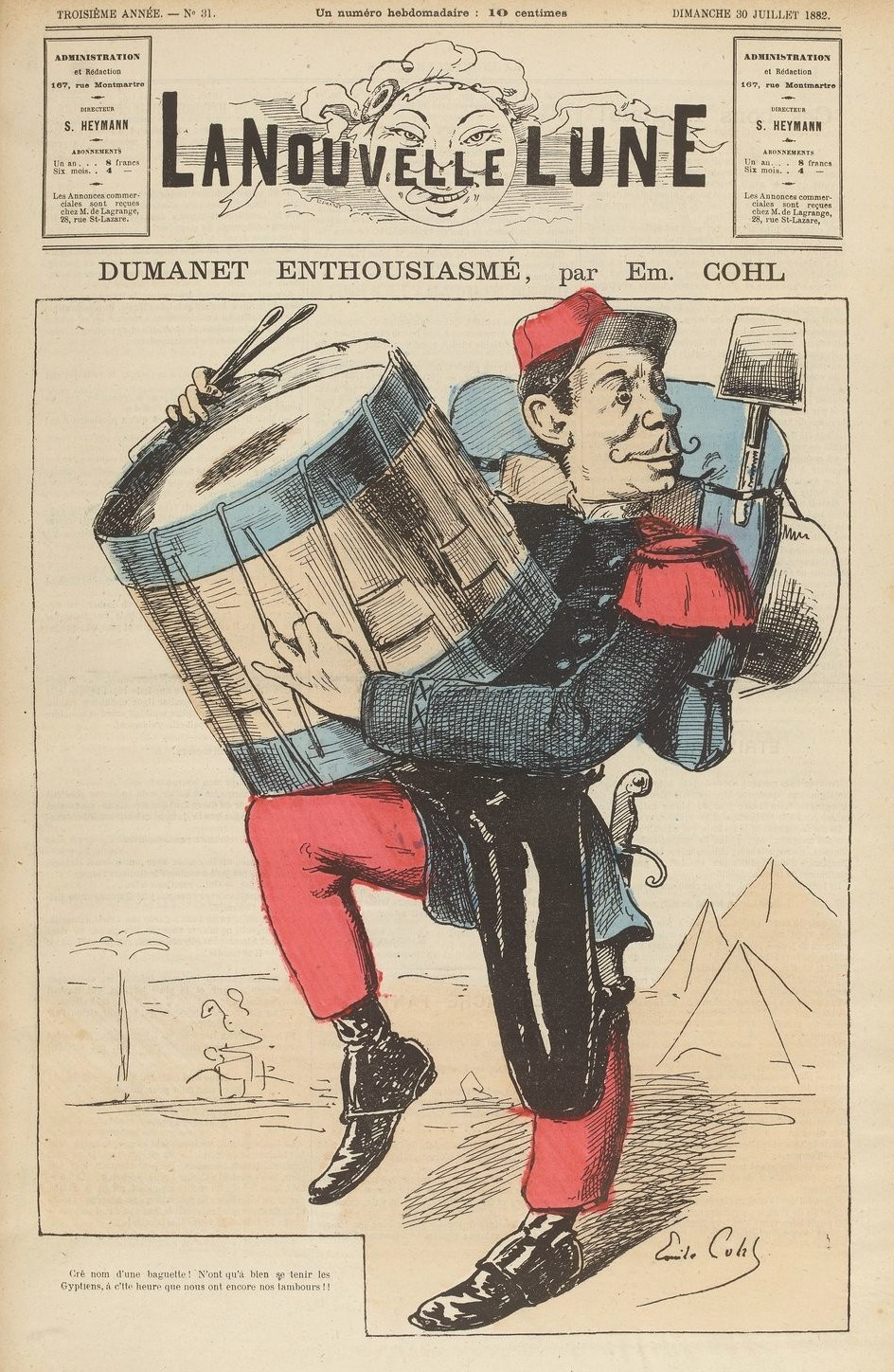
An 1882 caricature of the boastful character Dumanet, from their 1831 play The Tricolour Cockade

Their 1831 play The Tricolour Cockade set during the French conquest of Algeria gave rise to the concept of chauvinism named after the character Nicolas Chauvin, a young and excessively patriotic recruit who idealises the former French Emperor Napoleon.

== Sources ==
- Huart, Louis, "Frères Cogniard" in Louis Huart and Charles Philipon (eds), Galerie de la presse, de la littérature et des beaux-arts, Volume 1, Bureau de la Publication, et Chez Aubert, 1839
- The New York Times, "Theodore Cogniard, Dramatist" May 27, 1872
