= Julien de Mallian =

French playwright

- Born: 12 November 1805; Le Moule, Guadeloupe
- Died: March 1851 (aged 45); Paris, France
- Occupations: Playwright, librettist

Julien de Mallian (12 Novembre 1805 – March 1851) was a 19th-century French playwright.

He briefly studied law before turning to dramatic composition. His plays often signed only with his first name, were presented on the greatest Parisian stages of the 19th century: Théâtre de la Gaîté, Théâtre de l'Ambigu, Théâtre de la Porte-Saint-Martin, Théâtre des Variétés etc.

== Works ==
- 1828: La Cuisine au salon, ou le Cuisinier et le marmiton, one-act play, mingled with couplets, with Dumanoir
- 1828: La Semaine des amours, roman vaudeville in 7 chapters, with Dumanoir
- 1829: L'Audience du juge de paix, ou le Bureau de conciliation, tableau in 1 act, with Charles de Livry
- 1829: La Barrière du combat, ou le Théâtre des animaux, 2 tableaux mingled with animals and couplets, with de Livry and Adolphe de Leuven
- 1829: Frétillon ou la Bonne fille, comédie en vaudevilles in 1 act, preceded by La Première représentation, historical comedy in 3 parts, with Dumanoir and Michel Masson
- 1830: Le Charpentier, ou Vice est pauvreté, vaudeville populaire in 4 tableaux and preceded by Jour de la noce, prologue in one small act
- 1830: La Monnaie de singe, ou le Loyer de la danseuse, comédie en vaudevilles in 1 act, with Dumanoir
- 1830: Le Voyage de la mariée, imitation contemporaine de la Fiancée du roi de Garbe, with Dumanoir and de Leuven
- 1831: Camille Desmoulins, ou Les partis en 1794, historical drama in 5 acts, with Henri-Louis Blanchard
- 1831: Le Fossé des Tuileries, revue-vaudeville in 1 act, with Dumanoir and Victor Lhérie
- 1831: La Perle des maris, comédie en vaudevilles in 1 act, with Jean-François-Alfred Bayard and Dumanoir
- 1831: Saint-Denis, ou une insurrection de demoiselles, chronique de 1828, in 3 acts, mingled with couplets, with Dumanoir
- 1832: La jolie fille de Parme, drama in 3 acts and in 7 tableaux, preceded by a prologue, with Jules-Édouard Alboize de Pujol
- 1832: Le dernier chapitre, comédie en vaudevilles in 1 act, with Dumanoir and Mélesville
- 1832: L'Homme qui bat sa femme, tableau populaire in 1 act, mingled with couplets, with Dumanoir
- 1832: Le Secret de la future, vaudeville in 1 act, with Léon Lévy Brunswick
- 1833: Les Deux roses, historical drama in 5 acts
- 1833: Les Fileuses, comédie en vaudevilles in 1 act
- 1833: Les Tirelaines, ou Paris en 1667, comédie en vaudevilles in 3 acts, with Dumanoir
- 1834: Le Juif errant, drama fantastic in 5 acts and 1 epilogue, with Merville
- 1834: Turiaf le pendu, comedy in 1 act, with Dumanoir
- 1834: Les dernières scènes de la fronde, drama in 3 acts
- 1834: Le curé Mérino, drama in 5 acts, with Bernard and Pierre Tournemine
- 1834: L'honneur dans le crime, drama in 5 acts
- 1835: La nonne sanglante, drama in 5 acts, with Anicet Bourgeois
- 1835: Roger, ou Le curé de Champaubert, drama-vaudeville in 2 acts, with Armand d'Artois
- 1835: Un de ses frères, souvenir historique de 1807, mingled with couplets, with Dumanoir
- 1835: La Fille de Robert Macaire, comical melodrama in 2 acts, with Mathieu Barthélemy Thouin
- 1835: La Tache de sang, drama in 3 acts, music by Philippe-Alexis Béancourt, after Auguste-Louis-Désiré Boulé
- 1836: Le Vagabond, drame populaire in 1 act, with Cormon
- 1837: L'esclave Andréa, drama in 5 acts
- 1837: La Dame de Laval, drama in 3 acts and 6 tableaux
- 1837: Henriette Wilson, comédie en vaudevilles in 2 acts, with Dumanoir
- 1837: Le réfractaire, ou Une nuit de la mi-carême, vaudeville in 2 acts, with Eugène Cormon
- 1837: Thomas Maurevert, drama in 5 acts preceded by a prologue
- 1838: La croix de feu ou Les pieds noirs d'Irlande, melodrama in 3 acts, with Louis Marie Fontan
- 1838: Deux vieux garçons, vaudeville in 1 act, with Louis-Émile Vanderburch
- 1838: La Femme au salon et le mari à l'atelier, comédie en vaudevilles on 2 acts, with Cormon
- 1839: Le massacre des innocents, drama in 5 acts, with Fontan
- 1839: La Fille de l'émir, drama in 2 acts
- 1841: Le Perruquier de l'Empereur, drama in 5 acts, with Charles Dupeuty
- 1842: Les brigands de la Loire, drama in 5 acts, with Félix Dutertre de Véteuil
- 1842: Le Diable des Pyrénées, drama in 3 acts
- 1845: Marie-Jeanne ou La femme du peuple, drama in 5 acts, with Adolphe d'Ennery, 1845
- 1845: Une expiation, drama in 4 acts, mingled with song
- 1846: Le château des sept tours, preceded by Les français en Égypte, épisode de 1799, prologue, drama in 5 acts, with Pujol
- 1847: La révolution française, drama in 4 acts and 16 tableaux, with Fabrice Labrousse
- 1849: Le Moulin des tilleuls, opéra comique in 1 act, with Cormon

== Bibliography ==
- Jean Marie Querard, Les supercheries littéraires dévoilées, 1853, p. 278
- Louis Gabriel Michaud, Biographie universelle ancienne et moderne, 1860, p. 267
- Georges d'Heylli, Dictionnaire des pseudonymes, 1869, p. 234
- James Grant Wilson, John Fiske, Appletons' Cyclopaedia of American Biography, vol.4, 1898, p. 183
- Jack Corzani, La Littérature des Antilles-Guyane françaises, vol.1, 1978, p. 154
