= Mathieu Barthélemy Thouin =

19th-century French playwright

Mathieu Barthélemy Thouin (born 1804 in Paris) was a 19th-century French playwright.

His plays were presented on the most important Parisian stages of the 19th century, including the Théâtre des Variétés, the Théâtre des Délassements-Comiques, the Théâtre de la Gaîté, and the Théâtre du Vaudeville.

== Works ==
- Les Cuisiniers diplomates, one-act comédie en vaudevilles, with Michel Masson and Edmond Rochefort, 1828
- Le Dernier jour d'un condamné, époque de la vie d'un romantique, in one tableau, with a prologue in verse, with Armand d'Artois, Victor Hugo and Michel Masson, 1829
- 1830: L'Épée, le bâton et le chausson, comédie en vaudevilles in four tableaux, with Victor Lhérie and Jérôme-Léon Vidal
- 1831: La Jeunesse de Talma, one-act comédie en vaudevilles, with Brunswick and Lhérie
- 1831: Mme Lavalette, two-act historical drama, with Brunswick and Lhérie
- 1831: Le Mort sous le scellé, one-act folie, mingled with couplets, with Lhérie and Vidal
- 1832: L'Art de ne pas monter sa garde, one-act comédie en vaudevilles, with Lhérie
- 1832: Le Conseil de révision, ou Les Mauvais numéros, two-act tableau-vaudeville, with Lhérie and Léon Lévy Brunswick
- 1832: L'Audience du Roi, one-act comédie en vaudevilles
- 1832: Une Course en fiacre, two-act comédie en vaudevilles, with Ernest Jaime
- 1834: La Gueule de lion, one-act comedy, mingled with singing, with Brunswick
- 1834: Le Prix de vertu, ou les Trois baisers, comédie en vaudevilles in five tableaux, with Brunswick
- 1834: Si j'étais grand !, five-act comedy mingled with couplets, with Brunswick
- 1835: La Fille de Robert Macaire, two-act humorous melodrama, with Julien de Mallian
- 1836: La Barrière des martyrs, prologue in one act, with Eugène Fillot and Fleury1
- 1836: Le Camarade de chambrée, one-act comédie en vaudevilles, with Fillot
- 1836: L'Ennemi intime, two-act comédie en vaudevilles, with Léon-Lévy Brunswick and Louis-Émile Vanderburch
- 1836: Les Petits métiers, one-act tableau populaire, mingled with couplets, with Fillot
- 1836: La Sonnette de nuit, one-act comédie en vaudevilles, with Jaime and Brunswick
- 1837: L'École de danse à 75 centimes le cachet, one-act tableau-vaudeville, with Fillot
- 1837: La Page 24, ou les Souvenirs de ma grand'mère, one-act comédie en vaudevilles, with Adolphe de Leuven and Lhérie
- 1837: Les Pages du Czar, ou Lequel des deux ?, one-act comédie en vaudevilles, with Fillot
- 1843: Cantatrice et marquise, three-act comédie en vaudevilles, with Fillot
- 1845: Le Coiffeur des dames, one-act comédie en vaudevilles
- 1845: Un Voyage à Paris, three-act comédie en vaudevilles, with Achille Bourdois
- 1846: La Faute du mari, two-act comédie en vaudevilles, with Auguste Jouhaud
- 1846: Le Zodiaque, satires
- 1847: Les Filles d'honneur de la reine, one-act comédie en vaudevilles, with Fillot
- 1847: L'Hospitalité d'une grisette, one-act comédie en vaudevilles, with Delacour
- 1849: Un Déluge d'inventions, revue de l'exposition de l'industrie, three-act comédie en vaudevilles
- 1849: Le Gibier du Roi, one-act comédie en vaudevilles, with Alfred Delacour
- 1852: Le Roi, la dame et le valet, three-act comédie en vaudevilles, with Fillot

== Bibliography ==
- Gustave Vapereau, Dictionnaire universel des contemporains, 1861, (pp. 115)
