= Bernard Lopez =

French playwright (1813–1896)

Bernard Lopez de Roberts (Paris, 1813 – Paris, 30 May 1896) was a 19th-century French playwright of Spanish origin.

His plays were given on the most important Parisian stages of his time, including the Théâtre du Vaudeville, the Théâtre de la Gaîté, the Théâtre des Variétés, and the Théâtre de l'Ambigu-Comique.

== Works ==
- 1839: Le Tribut des cent vierges, drama in 5 acts, with Pujol
- 1840: Les Pages et les poissardes, ou la Cour et la Halle, comédie-vaudeville in 2 acts, with Edmond Rochefort
- 1840: Aubray le médecin, melodrama in 3 acts, with Charles Desnoyer
- 1842: Les Chevau-légers de la Reine, comedy in 3 acts, mingled with song, with Charles Dupeuty
- 1843: La Chasse aux belles-filles, ou Garçon à marier, vaudeville in 4 acts, with Laurencin
- 1844: Turlurette, comédie-vaudeville in 1 act
- 1846: Les Frères Dondaine, vaudeville in 1 act, with Charles Varin
- 1847: Le Phare de Bréhat, ou Un, deux et trois, comédie-vaudeville in 1 act, with Edmond de Biéville
- 1847: Jacques le Fataliste, comédie-vaudeville in 2 acts, with Clairville and Dumanoir
- 1847: Regardez mais ne touchez pas !, swashbuckling comedy, with Théophile Gautier.
- 1848: La Taverne du Diable, drama in 5 acts and 6 tableaux, with Pujol
- 1848: Mademoiselle de Choisy, comedy vaudeville in 1 act, with Henri de Saint-Georges
- 1848: Roger Bontemps, vaudeville in 1 act, with Clairville
- 1849: Les beautés de la cour, comédie-vaudeville in 2 acts, with Jules-Édouard Alboize de Pujol
- 1852 L'imagier de Harlem ou La découverte de l'imprimerie, drame-légende extravaganza, in 5 acts and 10 tableaux, in prose and in verse, with Joseph Méry and Gérard de Nerval
- 1852 Les Filles sans dot, comedy in 3 acts, in prose, with Auguste Lefranc
- 1852: Le Sage et le fou, comedy in 3 acts, in verse, with Méry
- 1854:Grégoire, vaudeville in 1 act, with Hippolyte Cogniard
- 1854: Thibaud l'ébéniste, comédie-vaudeville en 1 act
- 1855: Frère et sœur, drama in 5 acts, with Joseph Méry
- 1858: Les trois Nicolas, opéra comique in 3 acts, with Gabriel de Lurieu and Eugène Scribe
- 1859: Paris hors Paris, vaudeville in 3 acts and 4 parts, with Clairville
- 1860: Trottmann le touriste, comédie-vaudeville in 3 acts, with Charles Narrey
- 1863: La Veillée allemande, drama in 1 act, with Alexandre Dumas
- 1864: La Fiancée aux millions, comedy in 3 acts, in verse, with Méry
- 1864: Robert Surcouf, drama in 5 acts and 8 tableaux, with Eugène Grangé
- 1866: L'Amour est un enfant, comedy in 1 act
- 1866:Les Français à Lisbonne, chronique militaire in 4 acts
- 1870: La Rue des Marmousets, comedy in 3 acts, with Alfred Delacour
- 1873: L'Eau qui dort, vaudeville-proverbe in 1 act, with Charles Narrey
- 1876: Le Vœu inutile, comedy in 1 act, in verse
- 1879: Les Ricochets du divorce, comedy in 4 acts, in prose

== Bibliography ==
- Gustave Vapereau, Dictionnaire universel des contemporains, vol.2, 1870, p. 1157 (Read online)
- Marie-Odile Mergnac, Les noms de famille en France: histoires et anecdotes, 2000, p. 207
