= Barthélemy Jarnet =

Barthélemy Jarnet was a 19th-century French playwright.

A dramaturge at the Théâtre Montmartre (1836), his plays were presented at the Théâtre du Vaudeville, the Théâtre des Délassements-Comiques and the Théâtre de la Gaîté.

== Works ==
- 1829: Les Cuisiniers diplomates, comédie en vaudeville in 1 act, with Edmond Rochefort and Michel Masson
- 1829: Le Brutal, vaudeville in 1 act, with Masson and Armand d'Artois
- 1834: La Gueule de Lion, one-act comedy, with Léon Lévy Brunswick
- 1847: Catherine 3/6, three-act vaudeville, parody of La Reine Margot by Alexandre Dumas, with Adolphe Salvat and Auguste Jouhaud

== Bibliography ==
- Maurice Artus, Le théâtre Montmartre, 1904, (p. 27)
