= Victor Lhérie =

French librettist and playwright

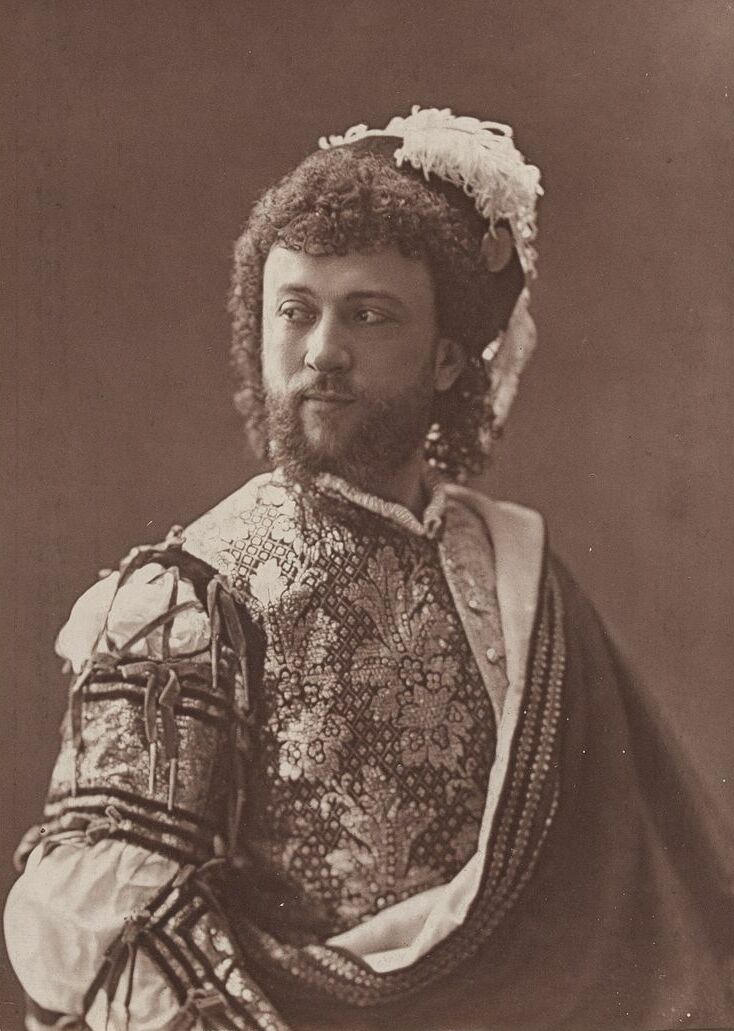
- Born: 4 May 1808; Paris, France
- Died: 29 March 1845 (aged 36); Paris, France
- Occupations: Playwright, librettist

Victor Lhérie (4 May 1808 – 29 March 1845) was a French librettist and playwright.

== Biography ==
The son of a jeweler, he was destined to take over from his father when attracted to the theater, he was hired as an actor in Jules and Edmond Seveste's troupes. He made his debut 4 April 1826 at the Théâtre des Variétés in the role of the lover of the play France et Savoie then was noted for his comic yard in the role of a waiter in L’École de natation (5 August 1828), which ensured that comedy a strong success. He afterward specialized in the roles of female transvestites.

From 1829, he began writing parodies, often with his brother Léon Lévy Brunswick and Léon Vidal, while continuing his acting career. In 1838 and 1848 he played in Brussels, but on his return went insane

The plays he wrote during his short career were presented in the most famous Parisian theatres of the 19th century including the Théâtre de la Gaité, the Théâtre des Variétés, and the Théâtre des Nouveautés.

== Works ==
- 1829: Les Suites d'un mariage de raison, drama in 1 act mingled with couplets, with Armand d'Artois
- 1830: L'Épée, le bâton et le chausson, comédie en vaudeville in 4 scenes, with Léon de Céran
- 1830: Mme Lavalette, historical drama in 2 acts, with Mathieu Barthélemy Thouin
- 1831: Encore un préjugé, ou les Deux éligibles, comédie en vaudevilles in 3 acts, with Amable de Saint-Hilaire and Brunswick
- 1831 Les Croix et le charivari, à-propos in 1 act, mingled with couplets, with Brunswick and de Céran
- 1832: L'art de ne pas monter sa garde, vaudeville in 1 act, with Mathieu-Barthélémy Thouin
- 1832: Le Fossé des Tuileries, revue-vaudeville in 1 act, with Julien de Mallian and Philippe Dumanoir
- 1832: Le Mort sous le scellé, foly in 1 act, with Thouin and Jérôme-Léon Vidal
- 1834: La Gueule de lion, comedy in 1 act, mingled with song, with Brunswick
- 1835: Le Sauveur, comedy in 3 acts, mingled with couplets, with Léon Halévy
- 1835: Un tissu d'horreurs, vaudeville in 1 act, with Brunswick
- 1836: Il campanello, one-act melodrama, with Gaetano Donizetti
- 1836: Crime et mystère, mélodrame manqué, mingled with songs, with Dumersan
- 1836: Frogères et Loupin, ou le Voyage en Sibérie, vaudeville anecdotique, in 2 acts, with Brunswick
- 1836: La sonnette de nuit, comédie en vaudevilles in 1 act, with Léon Lévy Brunswick and Mathieu-Barthélémy Thouin
- 1838: Faublas, comedy in 5 acts, mingled with songs, with Brunswick and Charles Dupeuty

== Bibliography ==
- Félix Delhasse, Annuaire dramatique de la Belgique, 1845, p. 176 Read on line
- Joseph-Marie Quérard, Félix Bourquelot, Charles Louandre, La littérature française contemporaine, vol.5, 1854, (p. 141)
- Victor Fournel, Curiosités théâtrales anciennes et modernes..., 1878, (p. 382)
