= Pierre-Luc-Charles Cicéri =

French painter

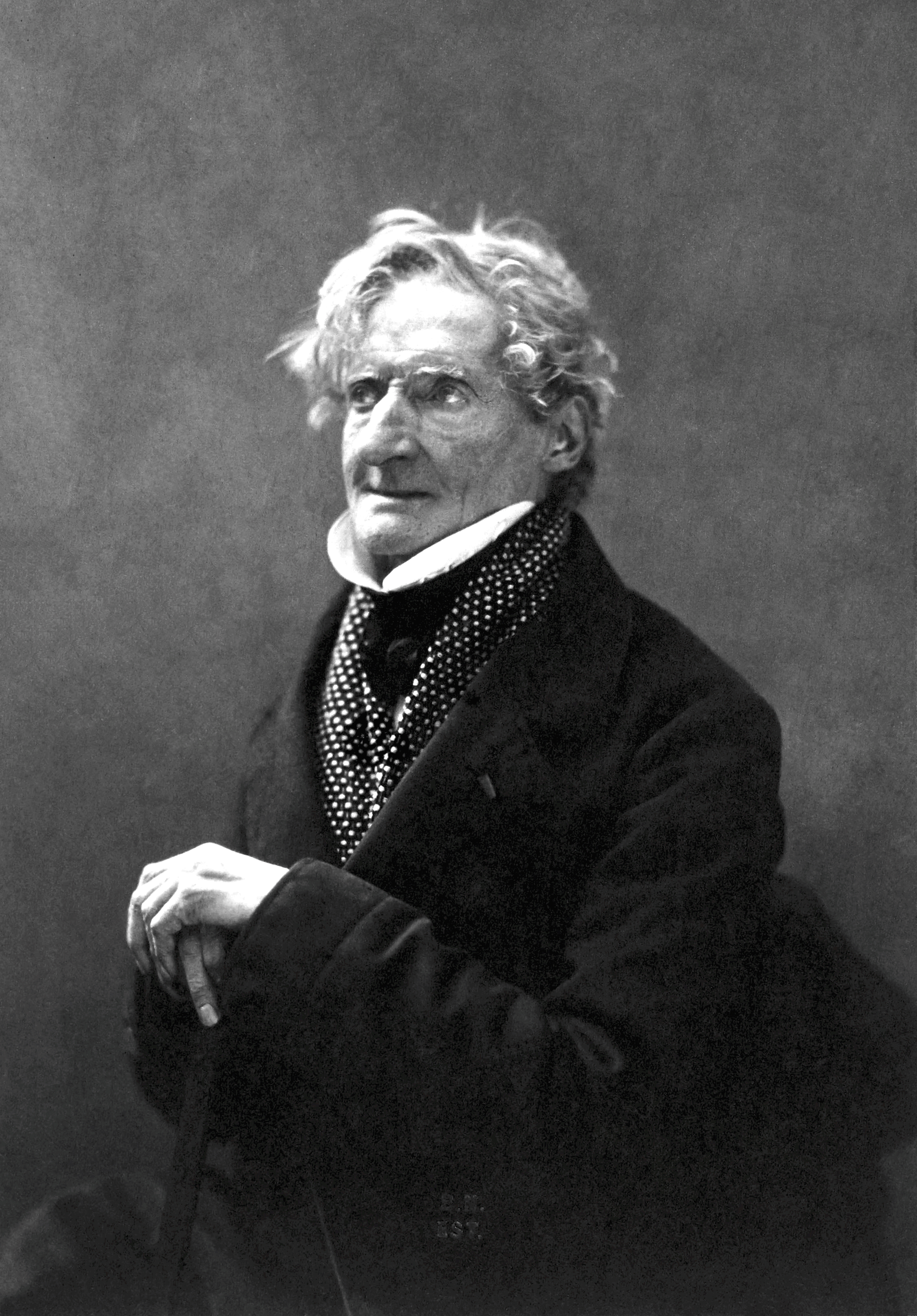
Pierre-Luc-Charles Ciceri, photograph by Nadar

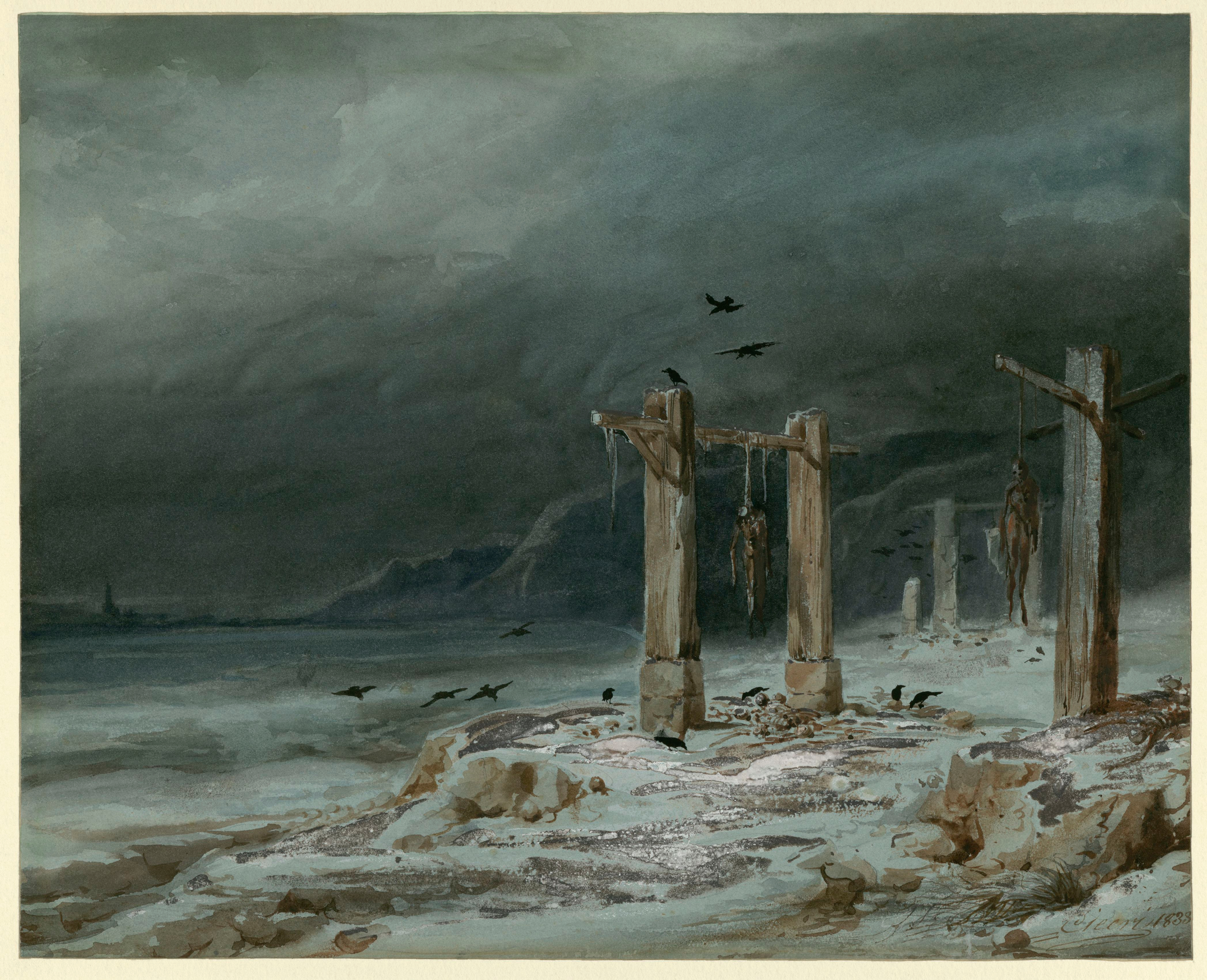
Set design for Act III of Daniel Auber's Gustave III (1833)

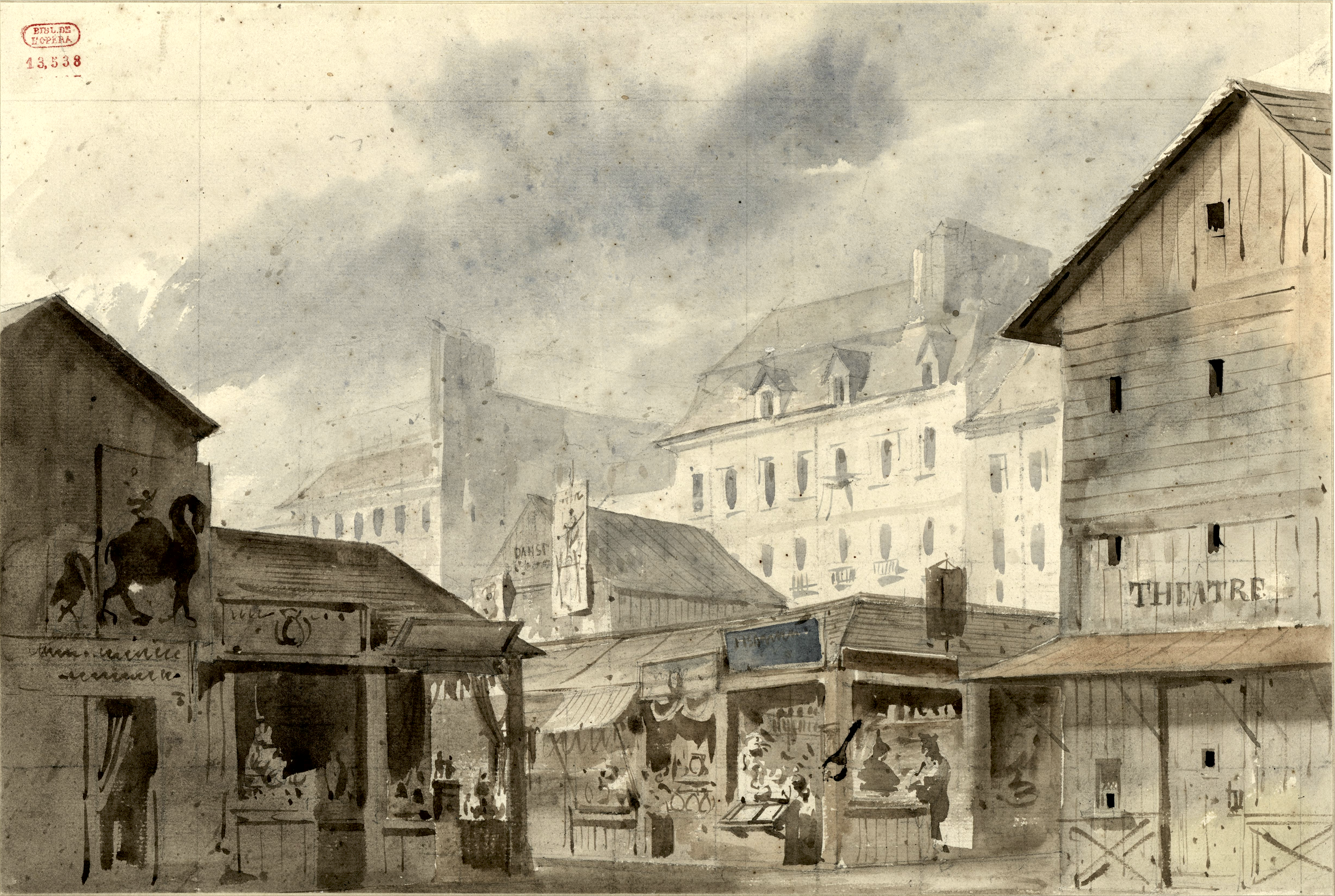
Watercolor sketch for the set of the ballet, Manon Lescaut, by Jean-Louis Aumer (1830)

Pierre-Luc-Charles Cicéri (17 August 1782 – 22 August 1868) was a leading French set designer of his era.

== Life and works ==
He was chief set designer for the Paris Opera from 1810 to 1847, and created the set designs for over 300 ballets and operas in his long career. In addition to his work at the Paris Opera, he designed for many of the leading theaters in Paris, including the Odéon, Palais-Royal, Comédie-Française, Théâtre des Nouveautés and the Théâtre de la Porte Saint-Martin. As Painter to the King of France, he supervised the decorations for the coronation of Charles X in 1825.

Cicéri designed the set for the first performance of La belle au bois dormant ("Sleeping Beauty"), which opened on 2 March 1825 at the Théâtre de l'Académie Royale de Musique in Paris. For La belle au bois dormant Ciceri created a quasi-cinematic motion effect onstage utilizing a treadmill for the actors in front of a moving cyclorama. He also designed the sets for a ballet version of Jocko ou le Singe du Brésil ("Jocko or the Monkey of Brazil") by Frédéric-Auguste Blache, with music by Louis Alexandre Piccinni. The ballet was first performed at the Théâtre de la Porte Saint-Martin in Paris on 16 March 1825.

He was awarded a Chevalier of the Légion d'honneur. His son, Eugène Cicéri, also became a painter, illustrator and set designer.
