= Jules Chabot de Bouin =

French writer, novelist and playwright (1807–1857)

Nicolas Jules Chabot de Bouin (French: [ʒyl ʃabo də bwɛ̃]; Chef-Boutonne, 5 September 1807 – Paris 1857) was a French writer, novelist and playwright of the 19th century.

He composed both under his name and under the pseudonyms Jules Pecharel, Michel Morin and Octave de Saint-Ernest.

His plays were presented on several Parisian stages of his time, such as the Théâtre des Variétés, the Théâtre de la Porte-Saint-Martin, the Théâtre des Folies-Dramatiques, the Théâtre de l'Ambigu-Comique, the Théâtre de la Renaissance, the Théâtre du Gymnase, the Théâtre de Madame, and the Théâtre du Panthéon.

== Works ==
- 1827: La Marraine, comédie vaudeville in 1 act, with Lockroy and Eugène Scribe
- 1829: La Jeune Fille et la Veuve, comédie-vaudeville in 1 act, with Jean-François-Alfred Bayard
- 1832: La Mouche du mari, comédie-vaudeville in 1 act, with Philippe Dumanoir
- 1832: Le Fils du savetier, ou les Amours de Télémaque, vaudeville in 1 act, with Achille d'Artois
- 1833: Le Gil-Blas du théâtre, under Michel Morin
- 1834: Élie Tobias, histoire allemande de 1516
- 1834: La Vieille Fille, comédie vaudeville in 1 act, with Bayard
- 1835: Histoire de deux sœurs
- 1836: Les Deux Étoiles, ou les Petites Causes et les Grands Effets, vaudeville philosophique in 3 acts
- 1836: Le Moutard des faubourgs, vaudeville in 1 act, under Jules Pecharel
- 1837: Giuseppo, drama in 5 acts, with Auguste-Louis-Désiré Boulé
- 1837: Le Matelot à terre, croquis de marine in 1 act, with Jules-Édouard Alboize de Pujol
- 1837: Rita l'espagnole, drama in 4 acts, with Boulé, Charles Desnoyer and Eugène Sue
- 1837: Le Roi de carreau, vaudeville in 1 act, with Victor Masselin
- 1838: La Maîtresse d'un ami, comédie-vaudeville in 1 act, with Desnoyer
- 1838: Adriane Ritter, drama in 5 acts
- 1840: Paula, drama in 5 acts, with Boulé
- 1841: Le Beau-Père, comédie-vaudeville, with Eugène Cormon
- 1841: L'Hospitalité, vaudeville in 1 act, with Cormon
- 1841: Le Quinze avant midi, comédie-vaudeville in 1 act, with Cormon, 1841
- 1842: Physiologie de la première nuit des noces, under Octave de Saint-Ernest
- 1843: Les Naufrageurs de Kérougal, drama in 4 acts, with Boulé and Saint-Yves
- 1844: Jeanne, drama in 6 parts and 2 periods, with Boulé and Louis-Nicolas Brette Saint-Ernest, 1844
- 1846: Vingt francs par jour, comédie-vaudeville in 2 acts, with Cormon
- 1846: Nouvelle grammaire conjugale, ou Principes généraux didactiques, à l'aide desquels on peut conduire et dresser une femme, la faire marcher au doigt et à l’œil, la rendre souple comme un gant et douce comme un mouton, précédés de considérations sur l'amour, les femmes et le mariage, under Octave de Saint-Ernest
- La Quête des volailles, comédie-vaudeville in 1 act

== Bibliography ==
- Louis Gustave Vapereau, Dictionnaire universel des contemporains, 1865, (p. 353)
- Edmond-Denis De Manne, Nouveau dictionnaire des ouvrages anonymes et pseudonymes, 1868, (p. 149)
- Georges d'Heylli, Dictionnaire des pseudonymes, 1869, (p. 260)
- Jules Gay, Analectes du bibliophile, 1876, (p. 186)
- Maurice Poignat, Le pays mellois, 1982, (p. 174)
