= Philippe-Alexis Béancourt =

French composer and conductor

Philippe-Alexis Béancourt (10 June 1792 – 6 January 1862) was a 19th-century French composer and conductor.

== Biography ==
Born in Versailles (city), Béancourt was a composer of stage music. He was also the conductor of the Théâtre des Nouveautés (1827–1831), the Théâtre Comte (1830), and then the Théâtre de la Gaîté (1835–1849).

He died in Paris.

== Works ==
- Faust, lyrics by Emmanuel Théaulon and Jean-Baptiste Gondelier, morceaux détachés singing and piano (or harp), 1827
- Rendez-vous, lyrics by Mathurin-Joseph Brisset, 1827
- Jean, lyrics by Théaulon and Alphonse Signol, air, chant et piano, 1828
- La Tache de sang, three-act drama, with Julien de Mallian (libretto), 1835
- Les Sept châteaux du diable, féerie, quadrille for the piano, Théâtre Impérial du Châtelet, with Philippe Musard, lyrics by Adolphe d'Ennery and Clairville, 1844
- Air de la fiancée, lyrics by Achille d'Artois, undated
- Air de Mr Jovial, lyrics by Adolphe Choquart and Théaulon, undated
