= Charles Desnoyer =

French actor and playwright (1806–1858)

Charles Desnoyers
- Born: Charles-Louis-François Desnoyer; 6 April 1806; Paris
- Died: 6 February 1858 (aged 51); Paris
- Occupations: Actor, playwright, theatre manager

Charles-Louis-François Desnoyer, or Desnoyers, (6 April 1806 – 6 February 1858) was a 19th-century French actor, playwright and theatre manager.

He also wrote under the pen name Anatole de Beaulieu.

== Short biography ==
He made his debut as actor and author in 1827 with a comédie en vaudeville, Je serai comédien. He wrote many plays, comedies, dramas and melodramas for theaters on the boulevard du Crime in collaboration with other authors such as Eugène Nus, Léon Beauvallet or Adolphe d'Ennery. General manager of the Théâtre du Gymnase then at the Comédie-Française from 1841 to 1847, he became directing manager of the Théâtre de l'Ambigu-Comique in May 1852

When he died, La Presse read:

Mr.Charles Desnoyers, director of the theater of the Ambigu-Comique and playwright, died in the night from Friday to Saturday, from a devastating stroke. His funeral took place today Sunday. As a result of this unfortunate death, the theater of the Ambigu, whose privilege becomes vacant, stood down yesterday

== Works ==
=== Theatre ===
- 1825: L’Amour et la Guerre, vaudeville in 1 act by Charles Varin, Étienne Arago and Desnoyer, Théâtre du Vaudeville (22 August)
- 1826: Je serai comédien, comedy in 1 act
- 1828: L'Homme entre deux âges, comedy in 1 act mingled with couplets with Louis Marie Fontan
- 1828: Le Papier timbré, comedy in 1 act by Desnoyer
- 1828: Julien et Justine, ou Encore des ingénus, tableau villageois with Charles-Hippolyte Dubois-Davesnes
- 1829: Gillette de Narbonne ou le Mari malgré lui, comédie vaudeville in 3 acts with Jean-Joseph Ader and Fontan
- 1829: Alice ou les Fossoyeurs écossais, melodrama in 3 acts, music by Louis Alexandre Piccinni
- 1829: Le Ménage du maçon ou les Mauvaises Connaissances, pièce dramatique in 6 days with Dubois-Devesnes
- 1829: Le Séducteur et son élève, drama in 2 acts
- 1830: André le chansonnier, drama in 2 acts, mingled with Fontan
- 1830: La Leçon de dessin ou Mon ami Polycarpe, comedy in 1 act with Dubois-Davesnes
- 1831: Casimir ou le Premier Tête-à-tête, opéra comique in 2 acts, music by Adolphe Adam
- 1831: Le Faubourien, comédie-vaudeville in 1 act
- 1831: Les Polonais ou Février 1831, impromptu mingled with couplets
- 1831: Le Voyage de la Liberté, play in 4 acts mingled with songs with Fontan
- 1832: Les Chemins de fer, revue-vaudeville in 1 act with Arago and Maurice Alhoy, Vaudeville (31 December)
- 1832: Le Russe ou un Conseil de guerre, épisode de novembre 1831, drama in 2 acts mingled with couplets with Jules-Édouard Alboize de Pujol
- 1832: L'Île d'amour, drama in 3 acts with Pujol
- 1832: La Vengeance italienne ou le Français à Florence, comédie-vaudeville, with Charles-Gaspard Delestre-Poirson and Eugène Scribe
- 1832: Voltaire et Madame de Pompadour, comedy in 3 acts, with Jean-Baptiste-Pierre Lafitte
- 1832: Le Naufrage de la Méduse, drama in 5 acts, with Adolphe d'Ennery
- 1833: Le Royaume des femmes ou le Monde à l'envers, pièce fantastique in 2 acts, with Théodore Cogniard
- 1833: Le Souper du mari, opéra comique in 1 act, with Hippolyte Cogniard
- 1833: Le Mariage par ordre, épisode de l'histoire de Russie, drame-vaudeville in 2 acts, with Pujol
- 1834: Caravage (1599), drama in 3 acts, with Pujol
- 1834: Le Facteur ou la Justice des hommes, drama in 5 acts, with Charles Potier and Auguste-Louis-Désiré Boulé
- 1834: Un enfant, drama in 4 acts, imitated from the novel by Éléonore Tenaille de Vaulabelle
- 1834: Tout chemin mène à Rome, comédie-vaudeville in 1 act, with Lafitte
- 1834: Un soufflet, comédie vaudeville in 1 act, with Ennery
- 1835: La Femme du voisin, comédie vaudeville in 1 act
- 1835: Zazezizozu, féerie-vaudeville in 5 acts
- 1835: Marguerite de Quélus, drama in 3 acts, with Paul Foucher and Alexandre de Lavergne
- 1835: La Traite des Noirs, drama in 5 acts and extravaganza, with Pujol
- 1835: L'Ombre du mari, comédie-vaudeville in 1 act, with Agénor Altaroche
- 1835: Chérubin ou le Page de Napoléon, comédie-vaudeville in 2 acts, with Adrien Payn and Adrien Delaville
- 1836: Madeleine la sabotière, comédie vaudeville in 2 acts, with Jean-François-Alfred Bayard and Lafitte
- 1836: La Folle, drama in 3 acts
- 1836: Vaugelas ou le Ménage d'un savant, comédie-vaudeville in 1 act
- 1836: Valérie mariée, ou Aveugle et Jalouse, drama in 3 acts, with Lafitte
- 1836: Le Puits de Champvert ou l'Ouvrier lyonnais, drama in 3 acts
- 1836: Pierre le Grand, drama in 5 acts, with Hippolyte Auger
- 1836: Je suis fou, comédie-vaudeville in 1 act, with Foucher
- 1836: L'Épée de mon père, comédie-vaudeville in 1 act
- 1837: La Nouvelle Héloïse, drama in 3 acts, with Charles Labie
- 1837: Paul et Julien, ou les Deux Vocations, comédie-vaudeville in 2 acts
- 1837: Le Petit Chapeau ou le Rêve d'un soldat, fantastic drama in 6 parts
- 1837: Le Bouquet de bal, comedy in 1 act
- 1837: L'Ombre de Nicolet ou De plus fort en plus fort !, vaudeville épisodique in 1 act, with Charles Labie
- 1837: Rita l'espagnole, drama in 4 acts, with Boulé, Jules Chabot de Bouin and Eugène Sue
- 1837: Diane de Poitiers ou Deux fous et un roi, drama in 3 acts, with Hippolyte Rimbaut
- 1837: Valérie mariée, ou Aveugle et Jalouse, drama in 5 acts, with Lafitte
- 1838: La boulangère a des écus, comédie-vaudeville in 2 acts, with Gabriel de Lurieu and Emmanuel Théaulon
- 1838: La Maîtresse d'un ami, comédie-vaudeville in 1 act, with Chabot de Bouin
- 1838: Alix ou les Deux Mères, drama in 5 acts, with Alphonse Brot
- 1838: Le Général et le Jésuite, drama in 5 acts
- 1838: Richard Savage, drama in 5 acts
- 1838: Les Bédouins en voyage, « odyssée africaine en trois chants »
- 1839: Les Filles de l'enfer, fantastic drama in 4 acts, with Charles Dupeuty
- 1839: La Branche de chêne, drama in 5 acts, with Charles Lafont
- 1840: Ralph le bandit ou les Souterrains de Saint-Norbert, melodrama in 5 acts
- 1840: Aubray le médecin, melodrama in 3 acts, with Bernard Lopez
- 1840: Le Tremblement de terre de la Martinique, drama in 5 acts, with Lafont
- 1840: Mazagran, bulletin de l'armée d'Afrique, in 3 acts, with Ferdinand Laloue
- 1841: Le Débutant, ou l'Amour et la Comédie, comedy in 1 act mingled with couplets
- 1841: Le Marchand d'habits, drama in 5 acts, with Potier
- 1841: La Vie d'un comédien, comedy in 4 acts, with Eugène Labat
- 1841: La Mère de la débutante ou Je serai comédienne, comedy in 2 acts mingled with couplets
- 1842: Claudine, drama in 3 acts drawn from the short story by Jean-Pierre Claris de Florian, with Lubize
- 1842: La Caisse d'épargne, comédie-vaudeville in 3 acts
- 1842: Une jeunesse orageuse, comedy in 2 acts, with Louis Bergeron
- 1842: La Plaine de Grenelle, 1812, drama in 5 acts, with Hippolyte Leroux
- 1843: 6000 francs de récompense, drama in 5 acts
- 1843: Sur les toits, vaudeville in 1 act, with Charles Foliguet
- 1843: La Chambre verte, comedy in 2 acts mingled with song, with Foliguet
- 1844: Jacques le corsaire, drama in 5 acts, with Eugène Nus
- 1845: Enfant chéri des dames, comédie-vaudeville in 2 acts, with Karl Holbein
- 1845: L'Enseignement mutuel, comedy in 3 acts in prose, with Eugène Nus
- 1846: Montbailly ou la Calomnie, drama in 5 acts
- 1847: Le Trésor du pauvre, drama in 3 acts, mingled with songs, with Eugène Nus
- 1847: Jeanne d'Arc, drama in 5 acts and 10 tableaux
- 1847: Rose et Marguerite ou Faut-il des époux assortis, comedy in 3 acts, with Charles-Henri-Ladislas Laurençot
- 1848: Arme au bras !..., chanson dédiée à la garde nationale d'Amiens
- 1849: Le Comte de Sainte-Hélène, drama in 5 acts and 7 tableaux, with Lambert-Thiboust and Eugène Nus
- 1849: Le Congrès de la paix, vaudeville in 1 act
- 1849: Les Trois étages, ou Peuple, Noblesse et Bourgeoisie, drama in 3 acts
- 1850: Le Roi de Rome, drama in 5 acts, with Léon Beauvallet preceded by Napoléon, prologue in 2 parts followed by La Ville éternelle, epilogue in 2 tableaux
- 1850: Le Sopha, prologue-vaudeville in 1 act, with Eugène Labiche and Mélesville, preceded by Schahabaham XCIV
- 1851: La Dame aux trois couleurs, comédie-vaudeville in 3 acts, with Charles Raymond, Théâtre du Gymnase (18 June)
- 1851: L'Ivrogne et son enfant, vaudeville in 2 acts
- 1851: Le Testament d'un garçon, drama in 3 acts, in prose, with Eugène Nus
- 1852: La Bergère des Alpes, drama in 5 acts, with d'Ennery
- 1852: Les Gaîtés champêtres, comédie-vaudeville in 2 acts, with Jules Janin, Armand Durantin and Léon Guillard
- 1855: La Rentrée à Paris, popular drame in 1 act, mingled with vaudevilles

== Bibliography ==
- Gustave Vapereau, « Louis-François-Charles Desnoyer », Dictionnaire universel des contemporains, Hachette, 1858, p. 523, on Gallica
- Gustave Vapereau, L'Année littéraire et dramatique, vol.1, 1858, p. 450
- François Cavaignac, Eugène Labiche ou la Gaieté critique, 2003, p. 29
- Anne-Simone Dufief, Jean-Louis Cabanès, Le Roman au théâtre : Les Adaptations théâtrales au XIXe siècle, 2005, p. 64
