= Saint-Yves (1808–1871) =

French playwright (1808–1871)

- Born: Ernest-Antoine-Edmond-Édouard Déaddé; 9 November 1808; Former 3rd arrondissement of Paris
- Died: 23 July 1871 (aged 62); 9th arrondissement of Paris
- Occupation: Playwright
- Years active: 1832 – 1870

Saint-Yves (9 November 1808 – 23 July 1871) was the pen name of Édouard Déaddé, a 19th-century French playwright.

== Short biography ==
He was born Ernest-Antoine-Edmond-Édouard Déaddé in Paris. An employee at the Interior ministry, he became known as vaudevilliste under the pen name Saint-Yves and published numerous articles in the Revue et gazette musicale under the pseudonym D.A.D.

His numerous plays were presented on the most important Parisian stages of his time, including the Théâtre du Panthéon, the Théâtre des Variétés, the Théâtre du Palais-Royal, the Théâtre de l'Ambigu, the Théâtre des Folies-Dramatiques, and the Théâtre de la Gaîté. Several collaborative projects were discussed with Honoré de Balzac but none were realized.

He was the managing director of the Théâtre de la Porte-Saint-Antoine from 31 December 1839 to January 1841.

== Works ==
- Odette, ou la Petite reine, chronique-vaudeville du temps de Charles VI, 1832
- Le te deum et le de profundis, one-act comédie en vaudeville, with Benjamin Antier and Victor Ratier, 1832
- Léonie, ou les Suites de la colère, 1833
- Une matinée à Vincennes, ou le Conciliateur, comédie en vaudeville in 1 act, 1834
- Le souper du diable, vaudeville in 1 act, 1834
- Un pélerinage, comédie-vaudeville in 1 act, 1835
- La Préface de Gil Blas, one-act play, 1835
- Casque en cuir et pantalon garance, with Xavier Veyrat, 1836
- Le Maugrabin, drame mêlé de chants, 1836
- La fille du Danube, ou Ne m'oubliez pas, drame-vaudeville in 2 acts and extravaganza, with Veyrat, 1836
- Les Gitanos, ou le Prince et le chevrier, historical comedy in 1 act mingled with song, 1836
- La Caisse d'épargne, comédie-vaudeville in 1 act, with Édouard Delalain, 1836
- Le Début de Talma, comédie-vaudeville in 1 act, 1836
- Rosette, ou Promettre et tenir, comédie en vaudeville in 2 periods, with Alexandre de Lavergne, 1836
- L'Amour d'une reine, drama in 3 acts, 1837
- Le Forgeron, drame-vaudeville in 1 act, with Delalain, 1837
- Les ombres chinoises, comédie vaudeville in 2 acts, 1837
- Les marchands de bois, vaudeville in 1 act, with Hector Monréal, 1837
- Tabarin, ou un Bobêche d'autrefois, fantaisie in 1 act, mingled with song, 1837
- Les Regrets, vaudeville in 1 act, with X. Veyrat, 1837
- Rose et Colas, ou Une pièce de Sedaine, comédie en vaudeville in 2 acts, with Delalain and Victor Ratier, 1838
- Le Mariage d'orgueil, comédie en vaudeville in 2 acts, with Adolphe d'Ennery, 1838
- Une histoire de voleurs, drame vaudeville in 1 act, with Delalain, 1838
- Turcs et bayadères, ou le Bal de l'Ambigu, folie de carnaval in 2 tableaux mingled with couplets, with Amable de Saint-Hilaire, 1838
- Sous la Régence, comédie en vaudeville in 1 act, with Delalain, 1838
- La Fabrique, drame-vaudeville in 3 acts, with Édouard Delalain, 1839
- Mme de Brienne, drama in 2 acts, with Max Raoul, 1839
- Béatrix, drama in 4 acts, 1839
- Madame de Brienne, drama in 2 acts and in prose, 1839
- La Tarentule, imitation du ballet de l'Opéra, in 2 acts, mingled with song and dance, 1839
- Les Oiseaux de Bocace, vaudeville, with Desroziers, 1840
- Cocorico ou La poule de ma tante, vaudeville in 5 acts, with Michel Masson and Ferdinand de Villeneuve, 1840
- L'Autre ou les Deux maris, vaudeville in 1 act, with Alfred Desroziers, 1840
- Dinah l'Egyptienne, drama in 3 acts mingled with song, with Louis Lefebvre, 1840
- Le Piège à loup, vaudeville in 1 act, with X. Veyrat, 1841
- Au vert galant !, vaudeville in 2 acts, with Angel, 1842
- Eva ou le Grillon du foyer, comédie en vaudeville in 2 acts, with Choler, 1842
- Les Femmes et le secret, vaudeville in 1 act, with Delalain, 1843
- Le Saut périlleux, vaudeville in 1 act, 1843
- Les Naufrageurs de Kérougal, drama in 4 acts, extravaganza with Auguste-Louis-Désiré Boulé and Jules Chabot de Bouin, 1843
- La Perle de Morlaix, drame-vaudeville in 3 acts, with Édouard Delalain and Hippolyte Hostein, 1843
- La Tête de singe, vaudeville in 2 acts, with Dumanoir and Desroziers, 1844
- Brancas le rêveur, comédie en vaudeville in 1 act, with Alexandre de Lavergne, 1845
- L'Homme aux trente écus, comédie en vaudeville in 1 act, with Édouard Brisebarre, 1845
- Mademoiselle Bruscambille, comédie en vaudeville in 1 act, 1845
- Le fils du diable, drama in 5 acts and 11 tableaux, with Paul Féval, 1847
- Le Pot au lait, fable by La Fontaine, set in action, 1847
- Impressions de ménage, comédie en vaudeville in 1 act, with Brisebarre, 1847
- Mademoiselle Grabutot, vaudeville in 1 act, with Adolphe Choler, 1847
- Le Protégé de Molière, comedy in 1 act, in verses, 1848
- La république de Platon, vaudeville in 1 act, with Choler, 1848
- Candide ou Tout est pour le mieux, tale mingled with couplets in 3 acts and 5 tableaux, with Clairville et Choler, 1848
- Les Barricades de 1848, opéra patriotique in 1 act and 2 tableaux, with Brisebarre, 1848
- Une chaine anglaise, comédie en vaudeville in 3 acts, with Eugène Labiche, 1848
- Histoire de rire, vaudeville in 1 act, with Labiche, 1848
- Mademoiselle Carillon, vaudeville in 1 act, with Angel, 1849
- Le Baron de Castel-Sarrazin, comédie en vaudeville in 1 act, with Clairville and Alfred Desroziers, 1849
- Le Congrès de la paix, à-propos in 1 act, mingled with couplets, with Clairville, 1849
- Une femme exposée, vaudeville in 1 act, with Angel, 1849
- Les manchettes d'un vilain, comédie en vaudeville in 2 acts, with Labiche and Auguste Lefranc, 1849
- Le Marin de la garde, opéra comique in 1 act, 1849
- La Paix du ménage, comédie en vaudeville in 1 act, with Choler, 1849
- La baronne Bergamotte, comédie en vaudeville in 2 acts, with X.-B. Saintine, 1850
- Les Étoiles, ou le Voyage de la fiancée, vaudeville fantastique in 3 acts and 6 tableaux, 1850
- Le Rossignol des salons, comédie en vaudeville in 1 act, with Xavier de Montépin, 1850
- La Jeunesse de Louis XIV (1648), vaudeville anecdotique, 1851
- La Fille de Frétillon, vaudeville in 1 act, with Choler, 1851
- Belphégor, vaudeville fantastique in 1 act, with Choler and Dumanoir, 1851
- La Mort aux rats, folie-vaudeville in 1 acti, 1851
- Le Mari d'une jolie femme, comédie en vaudeville in 1 act, with Choler, 1851
- Alice, ou L'ange du foyer, comédie en vaudeville in 1 act, with Émile Colliot, 1852
- Marie Simon, drama in 5 acts, with Jules-Édouard Alboize de Pujol and Choler, 1852
- L'Amour au daguerréotype, vaudeville in 1 act, with Charles Varin, 1853
- Le Mariage au bâton, comédie en vaudeville in 1 act, with Xavier Eyma, 1853
- L'héritage de ma tante, comédie en vaudeville in 1 act, with Choler, 1854
- Le cousin Verdure, comédie en vaudeville in 1 act, with Pierre Zaccone, 1855
- Flaneuse, vaudeville in 1 act, 1855
- Zerbine, tableau bouffe, with Octave Féré, 1856
- La chanteuse de marbre, with O.Féré, 1857
- Le Nez d'argent, vaudeville in 1 act, with Choler and Alfred Delacour, 1857
- La belle Gabrielle, with O. Féré, 1857
- Les Chevaliers errants. Zohra la Morisque, with O. Féré, 1857
- Pianella, operetta in 1 act, with O. Féré, 1860
- Un bal sur la tête, vaudeville in 1 act, with Victor Bernard and Paul Siraudin, 1860
- Comme on gâte sa vie, comédie en vaudeville in 3 acts, with Choler, 1860
- Le sou de Lise, operetta in 1 act, with Zaccone, 1860
- Les Trabucayres, with O.Féré, 1862
- Le Comte de Bonneval, histoire du siècle dernier, with O. Féré, 1863
- Détournement de majeure, vaudeville in 1 act, with V. Bernard, and P. Siraudin, 1863
- Les Quatre femmes d'un pacha, with O. Féré, 1864
- Splendeurs et misères d'un renégat, with O. Féré, 1864
- Le Baron de Trenck, with Octave Féré, 1865
- Un mariage royal, with O. Féré, 1865
- Une femme dégelée, vaudeville in 1 act, with Choler and Clairville, 1865
- Les Chevaliers d'aventures, with O.Féré, 1865
- Les Amours du comte de Bonneval, with Octave Féré, 1866
- Louise de Guzman, with O. Féré, 1866
- Les Quatre femmes d'un pacha, with O. Féré, 1867
- Mademoiselle Pacifique, comédie en vaudeville in 1 act, with Choler, 1868
- L'Anneau de la veuve, 1870
- Le mari de la tzarine, with O. Féré, 1891 (posthumous)

== Bibliography ==
- Joseph M. Quérard, Charles Louandre, La littérature française contemporaine, 1848, (p. 157) (read online)
- Joseph-Marie Quérard, Maulde et Renou, Les supercheries littéraires dévoilées, 1852, (p. 248)
- Edmond Antoine Poinsot, Dictionnaire des Pseudonymes, 1869, (p. 305)
- Gustave Vapereau, Dictionnaire universel des contemporains, 1870, (p. 491) (read online)
- Pierre Larousse, Nouveau Larousse illustré, "Déaddé (Edouard)", vol. 3 (1898), (p. 537).
- Wild, Nicole (1989). Dictionnaire des théâtres parisiens au XIXe siècle: les théâtres et la musique. Paris: Aux Amateurs de livres. ISBN 9780828825863. ISBN 9782905053800 (paperback). View formats and editions at WorldCat.
