= Jean-Antoine Petipa =

French ballet dancer (1787–1855)

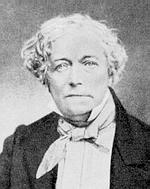
Jean-Antoine Petipa

Jean-Antoine-Nicolas Petipa (16 February 1787, Paris – 28 July 1855, Saint Petersburg) was a French ballet dancer and the father of ballet dancers and choreographers Marius Petipa and Lucien Petipa.

== Life ==
Aged 8 he was in the revived production of the ballet Psyché by Pierre Gardel, put on at the Opéra de Paris five years earlier. His débuts are only known from the programme of ballets and in a petition addressed by his father to the minister of the interior in 1799 with a view to obtaining one year's leave for his children, who were studying at the Opéra's dance school. Shortly afterwards young Petipa was enrolled in the troupe of Filippo Taglioni which criss-crossed Europe from 1807 after the closure of many Parisian theatres by imperial decree. The troupe set up a base in Kassel from 1810 to 1812 but left this city when France invaded Prussia on the eve of the invasion of Russia. It then went to look for other engagements, staying in Vienna and Naples.

Petipa was then taken on as a ballet master at Lyon for the 1813–14 season. He then hosted the Swedish prince Bernadotte and the troupe the prince had formed, then headed the ballet at the Théâtre-Français in Hamburg several times. In January 1814 Petipa and his troupe put on a series of productions at Brussels, then moved to Paris on the reopening of the Théâtre de la Porte Saint-Martin. Premier danseur in the new troupe, Antoine Petipa began creating ballets such as Les Six ingénus (music by Alexandre Piccinni) and Le Berger de la Sierra Morena (1815).

Taken on as ballet master at the Théâtre de Marseille, Petipa had his eldest son Lucien in 1815 and Marius in 1818. In 1819, Petipa was recalled to Brussels as ballet master at the Théâtre de la Monnaie, remaining there until 1831. Summoned to Lyon, Marseille and Bordeaux, Petipa returned to Brussels between 1833 and 1835 before moving to Bordeaux, where Lucien became premier danseur. The family then embarked for the United States of America in 1839, where they had a triumphal tour. On their return to Brussels between 1841 and 1843, Petipa put on new ballets there. In 1847 Petipa and his son Marius set up home in Saint Petersburg, There the son started the magnificent career that would propel him to his international acclaim and where the father was appointed a professor at the Imperial School of Ballet.

Among his Russian disciples: Lev Ivanov, Pavel Gerdt, Timofey Stukolkin etc.

== Main ballets ==
- Les Six ingénus, after Louis Duport (Brussels, 15 September 1814)
- Le Berger de la Sierra Morena, ou les Ruses d'amour (Paris, 16 February 1815)
- La Naissance de Vénus et de l'Amour, after Jean-Baptiste Blache (Marseille 1817)
- La Kermesse (Brussels, 1 September 1819)
- Clari, after Louis Milon (Brussels, 23 December 1821)
- Monsieur Deschalumeaux (Brussels, 24 February 1822)
- Psyché et l'Amour, after Pierre Gardel (Brussels, 19 January 1823)
- Les Amours de Vénus ou le Siège de Cythère, after Coindé (Brussels, 23 February 1824)
- Jenny ou le Mariage secret (Brussels, 23 January 1825)
- Frisac ou la Double noce (Brussels, 13 February 1825)
- Le Cinq juillet, ou l'Heureuse journée (Brussels, 9 July 1825)
- Monsieur de Pourceaugnac (Brussels, 5 February 1826)
- Jocko ou le Singe du Brésil (Brussels, 14 December 1826)
- Gulliver, after Jean Coralli (Brussels, 22 February 1827)
- Les Petites Danaïdes, ou Quatre-vingt-dix-neuf victimes (Brussels, 18 February 1828)
- Les Enchantements de Polichinelle, ou le Talisman (Brussels, 8 March 1829)
- La Tarentule, after Jean Coralli (Brussels, 17 September 1841)

Preceded by Eugène Hus	Director of the Ballet at the Théâtre de la Monnaie; 1819–1831	Succeeded by Victor Bartholomin
Preceded by Albert	Director of the Ballet at the Théâtre de la Monnaie; 1841–1843	Succeeded by Antoine Appiani
