= Charles de Livry =

French playwright (1802–1867)

Charles Sanguin, marquis de Livry (Paris 1802 – Enghien 14 October 1867) was a 19th-century French playwright.

After he made a career in the military, he became famous in the theatre. His plays, often signed Charles, were presented on the most important Parisian stages of his time including the Théâtre des Variétés, the Théâtre du Palais-Royal, the Théâtre de la Porte-Saint-Martin, and the Théâtre de la Gaité.

== Works ==
- 1828: Le Château de Monsieur le baron, comédie en vaudevilles in 2 acts, with Achille d'Artois and de Leuven
- 1828: Le Coup de pistolet, comédie en vaudevilles in 1 act, with Adolphe d'Houdetot
- 1828: L'École de natation, tableau-vaudeville in 1 act, with de Leuven and Alphonse Signol
- 1829: L'Audience du juge de paix, ou le Bureau de conciliation, tableau in 1 act, with Edmond Rochefort
- 1829: La Barrière du combat, ou le Théâtre des animaux, 2 tableaux mingled with animals and couplets, with Adolphe de Leuven and Julien de Mallian
- 1829: Le Tir au pistolet, vaudeville in 1 act, in 2 tableaux, with de Leuven and Masson
- 1829: La Tyrolienne, comédie en vaudevilles in 1 act, with de Leuven and Emmanuel Théaulon
- 1830: Madame Grégoire, ou le Cabaret de la pomme de pin, song in 2 acts, with Rochefortand Charles Dupeuty
- 1830: Un tour en Europe, nightmare in 5 fits, with prologue and epilogue, with Ferdinand Langlé and de Leuven
- 1831: Les Bouillons à domicile, revue-vaudeville in 1 act, with Gabriel de Lurieu and de Villeneuve
- 1831: La Caricature, ou les Croquis à la mode, album in 7 pochades, with de Lurieu and de Villeneuve
- 1831: Rabelais, ou le Presbytère de Meudon, comédie-anecdote mingled with couplets, with de Leuven
- 1831 Scaramouche, ou la Pièce interrompue, anecdote of 1669, in 2 acts, mingled with couplets, with Forges
- 1832: Le Bateau de blanchisseuses, tableau-vaudeville in 1 act
- 1832: Mon oncle Thomas, play in 5 acts and 6 tableaux, mingled with couplets, with Michel Masson
- 1833: La Révolte des femmes, vaudeville in 2 acts, with de Villeneuve
- 1833: Santeul ou Le chanoine au cabaret
- 1833: La Fille de Dominique, comédie en vaudevilles in 1 act, with de Villeneuve
- 1833: Les Locataires et les portiers, vaudeville in 1 act, with Brazier and de Villeneuve
- 1834: La Salamandre, comédie en vaudevilles in 4 acts, with de Leuven and Philippe-Auguste-Alfred Pittaud de Forges
- 1834: Un bal de domestiques, vaudeville in 1 act, with Ferdinand de Villeneuve
- 1834: Lionel, ou Mon avenir, comédie en vaudevilles in 2 acts, with de Villeneuve
- 1834: La Tempête, ou l'Île des bossus, folie-vaudeville in 1 act, with Forges and de Leuven
- 1835: Les Infidélités de Lisette, drama vaudeville in 5 acts, with Nicolas Brazier and de Villeneuve
- 1836: La Grue, fabliau mêlé de chant, with de Villeneuve
- 1836: Roquelaure, ou l'Homme le plus laid de France, vaudeville in 4 acts, with Léon Lévy Brunswick and de Leuven
- 1836: Madame Peterhoff, vaudeville anecdote in 1 act, with Antonin d'Avrecourt and Eugène Roche
- 1837: Mémoire d'une blanchisseuse, comedy in 1 act, mingled with couplets, with Brazier
- 1838: Mademoiselle Dangeville, comedy in 1 act, with de Villeneuve
- 1841: Voltaire en vacances, comédie en vaudevilles in 2 acts, with de Villeneuve
- 1847: Une vie de polichinelle, pantomime-arlequinade-féerie in 11 tableaux
- 1849: Les Épreuves, grande pantomime-arlequinade in 13 tableaux
- 1849: Les Naufrageurs de la Bretagne, dramatico-comic play, extravaganza mingled with pantomime, de combats au sabre, à la hache et au poignard, in 13 tableaux
- 1851: L'Audience du Prince, comédie en vaudevilles in 1 act, with Auguste Anicet-Bourgeois
- 1855: Trois têtes dans un bonnet, vaudeville in 1 act

== Bibliography ==
- Pierre Larousse, Grand Dictionnaire universel du XIXe, 1873
- Camille Dreyfus, André Berthelot, Livry, Charles marquis de, in La Grande encyclopédie : inventaire raisonné des sciences, des lettres et des arts, vol. 22, 1886, p. 372
- Alfred Mézières, Encyclopédie universelle du XXe, vol. 8, 1908, p. 260
- Bulletin de la Société de l'histoire du théâtre, vol. 2, 1908, p. 12
