= Louis-Nicolas Brette Saint-Ernest =

French actor and playwright

- Born: 3 May 1802; Orléans
- Died: 10 March 1860 (aged 57); Paris
- Occupations: Comedian, playwright

Louis-Nicolas Brette Saint-Ernest (3 May 1802 – 10 March 1860) was a 19th-century French actor and playwright.

== Biography ==
A master study in Paris and assistant bricklayer, he began acting in 1829 before being hired in 1832 by the Théâtre de la Porte-Saint-Martin. He then played for the Théâtre de l'Ambigu-Comique from 1837 to 1852. He often appeared in the role of the father in many sentimental plays.

Most of the time, his own plays that he signed Saint-Ernest, were presented at the Théâtre de l'Ambigu-Comique, of which he was managing director from 1848 to 1852. In 1852, he became dramaturge on the stage of the théâtre du Cirque, a position he still held when he died in 1860.

== Works ==
- 1832: Le naufrage de la Méduse
- 1834: Le juif errant
- 1835: Jeanne de Flandre
- 1837: Le corsaire noir
- 1837: L'honneur de ma mère
- 1837: Rose Ménard, ou Trop bonne mère, three-act drama, preceded by l'Aîné et le cadet, prologue in 1 act, with Auguste-Louis-Désiré Boulé
- 1838: Le chevalier du Temple
- 1838: Don Pèdre le mendiant, four-act drama, with Fabrice Labrousse
- 1838: L'élève de Saint-Cyr
- 1841: Jacques Coeur, l'argentier du roi
- 1842: Gaëtan il Mammone
- 1844: Jeanne, drama in 6 parts and 2 periods, with Boulé and Jules Chabot de Bouin
- 1845: Les mousquetaires
- 1845: Les talismans
- 1846: La closerie des genêts
- 1850: Notre Dame de Paris
- 1851: Henri le Lion, drama in 6 acts and 2 periods, with Eugène Fillot

== Bibliography ==
- Gustave Vapereau, Dictionnaire universel des contemporains, 1861, (p. 1545)
- Henry Lyonnet, Dictionnaire des comédiens français, 1911, (p. 617)
- Claude Schopp, Le théâtre historique: Directeurs, décorateurs, musique, 2009, (p. 71)
