= Alexandre Batta =

Dutch cellist (1816–1902)

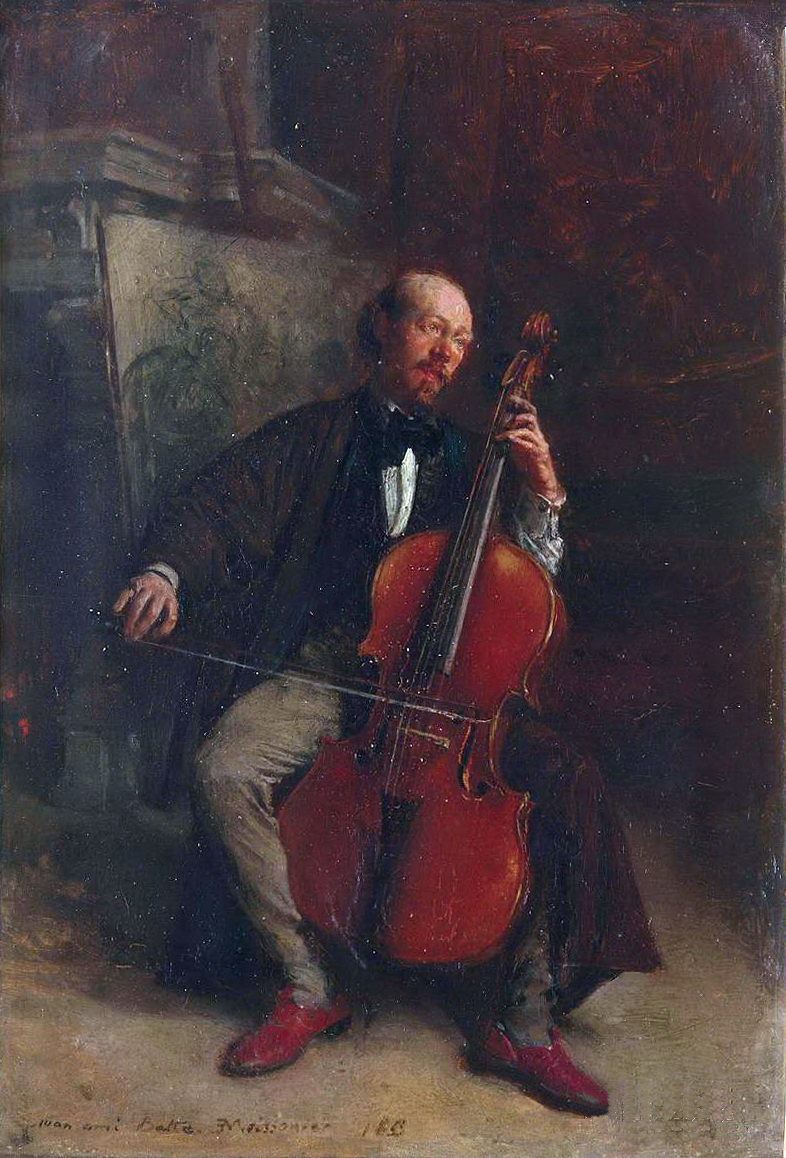
- Portrait by Ernest Meissonier, 1855
- Born: July 9, 1816; Maastricht, Netherlands
- Died: August 10, 1902 (aged 86); Versailles, France
- Education: Royal Conservatory of Brussels
- Occupation: Cellist
- Honours: Knight of the Legion of Honour

Alexandre Batta (July 9, 1816 – August 10, 1902) was a Dutch cellist. Born to a musical family, he initially played the violin before hearing cellist Nicolas-Joseph Platel play and switching to the cello. He studied with Platel at the Royal Conservatory of Brussels, winning first prize for cello in 1834. Music critic Henri-Louis Blanchard, writing in 1847, described Batta as one of the three great cellists of the time, alongside Auguste Franchomme and Adrien-François Servais. Batta was named a knight of the Legion of Honour in 1875.

== Life ==
Alexandre Batta was born on July 9, 1816, to a Belgian musical family in Maastricht. His father, Pierre, was a cellist. He had two younger brothers: Laurent, a pianist, and Joseph, a composer and violinist. Batta initially studied the violin and his youngest brother was to study the cello. However, Alexandre developed a passion for the cello after he heard Nicolas-Joseph Platel play. When his father left the house, he secretly played his brother's cello with his violin bow, convincing his father to allow him to study the instrument.

Batta was taught by his father before he studied at the Royal Conservatory of Brussels with Platel. There, he won the first prize for cello in 1834 alongside François de Munck. Batta left the Conservatory in 1835 and moved to Paris. In 1836, he bought a Stradivarius from a French dealer. The cello would later be named for him. In 1837, he played in a series of chamber concerts with Franz Liszt and Chrétien Urhan at the Salons Érard. The concerts included the Beethoven piano trios and were successful, influencing French composers. Batta played with Liszt again in 1840 in London and in 1841 in Paris. In 1847, Henri-Louis Blanchard described him as one of the three great cellists of the time, alongside Auguste Franchomme and Adrien-François Servais. From around 1849 to 1851, he participated in chamber music sessions with Achille Dien, a violinist, and Camille Saint-Saëns, who wrote an unfinished piano trio that may have been for the trio.

In his later years, Batta published musical criticisms in L'Union libérale et démocratique de Seine et Oise. In August 1875, he was named a knight of the Legion of Honour. His wife Clémentine, a composer, died of an illness in 1880. In 1893, he sold his Stradivarius to W. E. Hill & Sons. Batta died in Versailles on August 10, 1902.
