= Bernard (playwright) =

French actor, singer, playwright and theatre manager

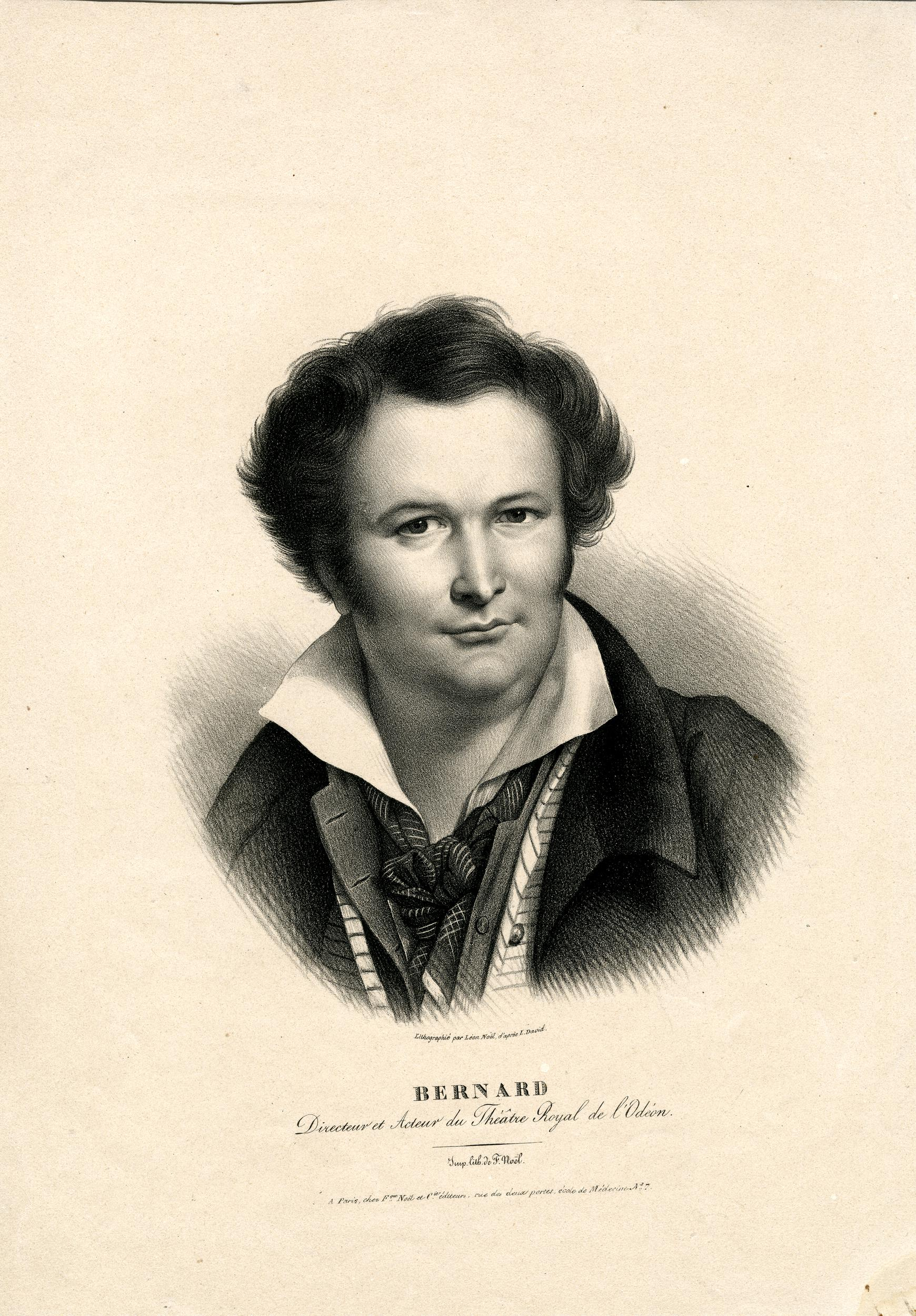
Portrait of the actor Bernard, 1825

Claude Wolf, called Bernard (Dutch Ceylon, 1785 – ?) was a 19th-century French actor, singer, playwright and theatre manager.

== Short biography ==
Bernard sang in Kassel in 1812, in Lille from 1813 to 1815, then at the Théâtre de la Monnaie in Brussels in 1818, theatre of which he became director the year after until 1823.

While he was managing director of La Monnaie he made his debut at the Comédie-Française in 1822, then left Brussels and became director of the Théâtre de l'Odéon in 1823, a position he would keep until 1826.

Bernard headed the Opéra de Marseille from 1828 to 1830.

He wrote some plays including:

- 1815: Jeanne Maillotte, ou la Cabaretière lilloise, two-act vaudeville, Lille, 9 November;
- 1815: L'Hommage de la garde nationale de Lille au roi, ou la Veille du jour de l'an, one-act vaudeville and extravaganza, Lille, 31 December;
- 1819: Momus à la nouvelle salle, prologue d'inauguration joué devant le roi et la reine des Pays-Bas, Brussels, 25 May;
- 1825: L'Homme de confiance, one-act vaudeville, with Félix-Auguste Duvert, Paris, Théâtre du Vaudeville, 13 June;
- 1830: Noé, ou le Déluge universel, three-act ballet, Marseille;
- 1834: Le Curé Mérino, five-act drama, with Mallian and Tournemine, Paris, Théâtre de l'Ambigu-Comique, 30 January.

== Bibliography ==
- Joseph-Marie Quérard (1827). "Bernard". La France littéraire, ou Dictionnaire bibliographique. Vol. 1. Paris: Firmin Didot, père et fils, libraires. p. 288..

Preceded by Jean-Baptiste-Sauveur Gavaudan	Director of Théâtre royal de la Monnaie; 1819-1823	Succeeded by Joseph Langle
