= Victor Ratier =

French lithographer, printer and writer (1807–1898)

- Born: Charles-Victor-Hilaire Ratier; 13 January 1807; Paris, France
- Died: 6 August 1898 (aged 91); Bourges, France
- Other name: Victor Benoît
- Occupations: Lithographer; Playwright; Translator

Charles-Victor-Hilaire Ratier (13 January 1807 – 6 August 1898) was a 19th-century French lithographer, playwright and printer.

== Biography ==
The son of a librarian in the Conseil d'État, Ratier became a teacher of English in the high school of Bourges. He later abandoned this occupation, became a journalist at the Journal du Cher, then a lithographer and printer, patented in Paris on 14 February 1829 in succession to Pierre-François Ducarme.

In 1829, he founded with the lithographer printer Sylvestre Nicolas Durier the illustrated periodical La Silhouette.

He made numerous lithographs and engravings for theatrical publications and magazines, including Album pour rire or Miroir des dames, and many poster prints. He was also the printer and translator of English-language novels, including Uncle Tom's Cabin by Harriet Beecher Stowe (1853) and Evangeline by Henry Longfellow (1864).

By his profession, letters were addressed to him by important personalities like Honoré de Balzac who was a friend.

His plays, including some written under the pseudonym Victor Benoît were presented on the most important Parisian stages of his time: Théâtre du Panthéon, Théâtre de l'Ambigu-Comique etc.

== Theatre works ==
- 1832: Le Te-Deum et le De Profundis, comédie en vaudeville in one act, with Déaddé Saint-Yves and Michel Théodore Leclercq
- 1832: Odette, ou la Petite reine, chronique-vaudeville du temps de Charles VI, with Saint-Yves
- 1835: Arthur et Frédéric, ou Un duel d'écoliers
- 1838: Rose et Colas, with Saint-Yves and Léon de Villiers, comédie en vaudeville in one act
- 1840: Les Chiffonniers et les Balayeurs, tragedies in one act and in verse, with Edmé-Jacques-Benoît Rathery
- 1842: Mme Tastu
- 1863: Pauvre Père, vaudeville in one act
- 1878: Le Dernier des Wiberg

== Bibliography ==
- Encyclopédie des gens du monde: répertoire universel des sciences..., vol. 4, 1834, p. 737
- Joseph-Marie Quérard, La France littéraire ou dictionnaire bibliographique..., 1854, p. 670
- Gustave Vapereau, Dictionnaire universel des contemporains, vol. 2, 1870, p. 1504 (read online)

== See also ==
- List of French artists
- List of French engravers
- List of French writers
- List of playwrights
- List of printmakers
- List of translators
