= Pierre Zaccone =

French novelist (1817–1895)

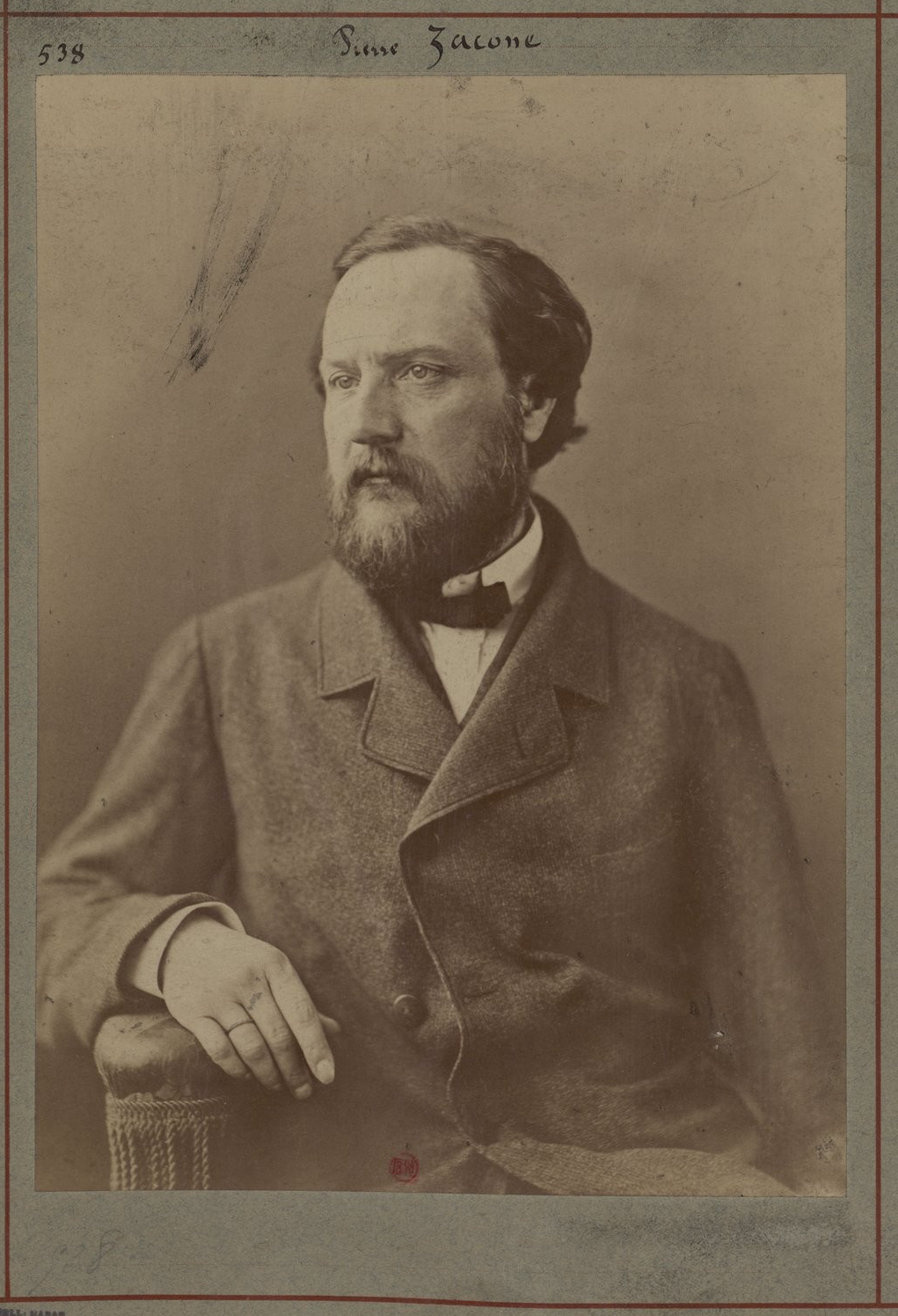
- Pierre Zaccone by Félix Nadar
- Born: 2 April 1817; Douai, France
- Died: 12 April 1895 (aged 78); Morlaix, France
- Occupation: Novelist

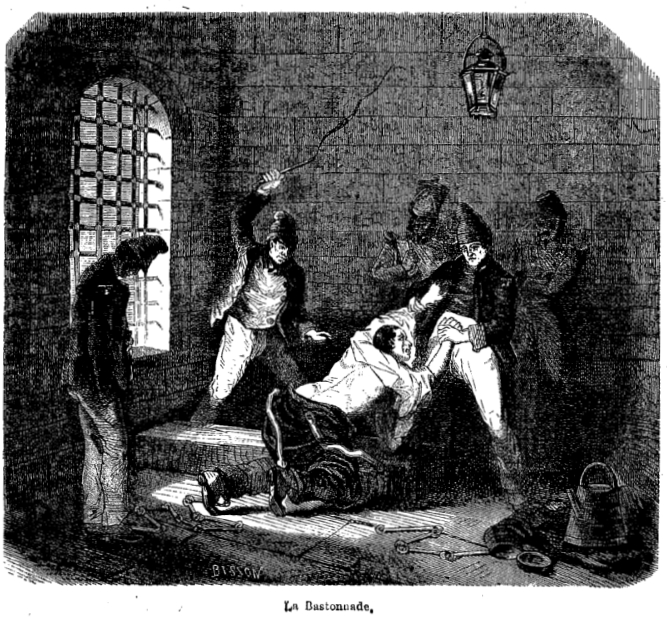
Caning, illustration of the fate of the convicts by Zaccone

Pierre Zaccone (2 April 1817 – 12 April 1895) was a popular 19th-century French novelist.

He owned a castle which is now named after him in Locquirec, a small Breton seaside resort located on the border of Finistère and Cotes d'Armor.

He wrote serialized novels, including several detective novels. He authored some dramas in collaboration, including Le cousin Verdure, comédie-vaudeville in 1 act by Saint-Yves in 1855 and one after his novel, Les Nuits du boulevard, in 1880. After 1870, much of his work was published by Édouard Dentu.

== Works ==
- Époque historique de la Bretagne (1845)
- Sous le masque (1845)
- Histoire des sociétés secrètes, politiques et religieuses (1847)
- Les Ouvriers de Paris et les ouvriers de Londres, with Paul Féval (2 volumes, 1850)
- Marguerite et Béatrix (1851), in collaboration with Émile Souvestre
- Le Dernier Rendez-vous (1851)
- Les Travailleurs au Moyen Âge (1851)
- Éric le Mendiant (1853)
- Le Clan breton (1853)
- Le Roi de la Bazoche (2 volumes, 1853)
- Le Drame des catacombes (1854)
- Le Vieux Paris (Adolphe Delahays, 1855)
- Les Ouvriers de l'avenir (1856)
- Le Fils du ciel, roman chinois (1857)
- L'Orphelin du temple (1859)
- Les Zouaves (1859)
- Les Mystères de la Chine (1860)
- La Bohémienne (1860)
- Le Vannier de Taulé (1860)
- Une banqueroute frauduleuse (1861)
- Les illuminés (1862)
- Les Mystères de Bicêtre (1864)
- Une haine au bagne (Victor Bunel éditeur, 1863)
- Les Plaisirs du Roi (1866)
- Un condamné à mort (1866)
- Un fils de forçat (1866)
- Jean Longues Jambes (1868).
- La Poste Anecdotique et Pittoresque (Librairie Achille Faure, Paris, 1869)
- Histoire des drames de police (1869)
- Les Drames de l'Internationale (2 volumes - Dentu, 1872)
- Un drame sur les pontons (J. Brouillet, 1872)
- La Lanterne rouge (1872)
- La Cellule n°7 (Dentu, 1874)
- Les Misérables de Londres (1874)
- Les Gueux (1874)
- Mémoires d'un commissaire de police (Dentu, 1875)
- Les Marchands d'or (1876)
- Histoire des bagnes (1876)
- L'Homme des foules (Dentu, 1877)
- Les Aventuriers de Paris (Dentu, 1877)
- La Dame d'Auteuil (1878)
- La Vie à outrance (1878)
- Le Courrier de Lyon (1879)
- Le Fer rouge (Dentu - 1879)
- Les Compagnons noirs (1880)
- La Vertu de Charbonnette (1880)
- Les Mansardes de Paris (1880)
- Les Nuits du boulevard (1880)
- Un duel à mort (1880)
- Histoire des conspirateurs anciens et modernes (1881), in collaboration with Constant Guéroult
- L'inconnu de Belleville (Dentu 1881)
- La Petite Bourgeoise (Dentu 1881)
- Maman Rocambole (1881)
- Blanchette (Dentu 1882 )
- La Recluse (1882)
- Les Drames de la bourse (1882)
- La Belle Diane (Dentu 1883)
- Poste restante (Nouvelle dans ouvrage collectif 47 Chaussée d'Antin, Dentu, 1886)
- Les Deux Robinsons (1887)
- La Chambre rouge (Plon 1887)
- Les Dimanches de Risette (Nouvelle dans ouvrage collectif Pique-Nique, Dentu, 1887)
- La Fille des camelots (Éditions Rouff 1888)
- L'Enfant du pavé (Dentu 1888)
- La Duchesse d'Alvarès (1889)
- Les Deux bohêmes (Nouvelle dans ouvrage collectif Les Compagnons de la Plume, Dentu, 1890)
- Le Crime de la rue Monge (Dentu 1890)
- Seuls (1891)
- Les Nuits de Paris (s. d.)
