= Nicolas-Joseph Platel =

French cellist and composer (1777–1835)

- Born: 1777; Versailles, France
- Died: 25 August 1835 (aged 57–58); Brussels, Belgium
- Education: Chapelle royale
- Occupations: Cellist; Composer; Academic teacher
- Organizations: Orchestra at the Antwerp Opera; Brussels Royal Opera; Royal Conservatory of Brussels

Nicolas-Joseph Platel (1777 – 25 August 1835) was a French cellist and composer. He is considered the founder of the Belgian school of cello playing. From 1831 until his death, he was the professor of cello at the Conservatoire de Musique in Brussels.

== Life ==
Nicolas-Joseph Platel was born in Versailles, France, in 1777. His father, a musician in the French Chapelle royale, placed him in the Institute of the Royal Pages, where Nicolas-Joseph studied singing. When he was ten years old, he showed an inclination for the cello and began training under Jean-Louis Duport, a friend of his father. Duport left France for Berlin at the end of 1789, leaving Platel without a teacher. In 1793, Jacques-Michel Hurel de Lamare – another pupil of Duport – began supervising Platel's studies.

Platel became a member of the orchestra at the Théâtre Feydeau in 1796. He fell in love with an actress there, and moved with her to Lyon in 1797. Platel returned to Paris in 1801, holding multiple successful concerts. At the time he was reputed the best cellist in France, with Duport still in Berlin and Lamare in Russia. In 1805, he embarked on a concert tour, but ended up staying in Quimper for two years after making a friend there. He then held successful concerts in Brest and Nantes before, on the way to Holland and Germany, settling in Ghent to teach singing and cello.

In 1813, Platel became the principal cellist of the orchestra at the Antwerp Opera. In 1819, he became principal cellist of the Royal Opera in Brussels. In Brussels, he met the Prince de Chimay who engaged him as a cello teacher at the Royal School of Music there. When the school was reorganized as the Conservatoire de Musique in 1831, he was made the professor of cello. Platel is considered the founder of the Belgian school of cello playing. His students included Adrien-François Servais, Alexandre Batta, and François de Munck, who would succeed him in the position. Platel is credited with inspiring Batta to switch from the violin to the cello.

Platel died in Brussels on 25 August 1835.

== Compositions ==
Platel composed five cello concertos, three books of sonatas, eight sets of variations, six romances with piano accompaniment, six duets for violin and cello, and three trios for violin, viola, and cello.
