= Batta-Piatigorsky Stradivarius =

The Batta-Piatigorsky Stradivarius is a cello made in Cremona, Italy in 1714 by Antonio Stradivari.

The Batta-Piatigorsky was acquired by the Dutch cellist Alexandre Batta in 1836. It had also been played by the prominent French virtuoso cellist, Adrien-François Servais. In 1893, Batta sold the cello to W.E. Hill & Sons in London. Hill then sold it to collector Baron Johann Knoop, from whom the renowned Ukrainian-American virtuoso cellist, Gregor Piatigorsky, acquired it.

Of the Batta Stradivarius (as it was known at the time he acquired it), Piatigorsky wrote in his autobiography, Cellist:

"I played the Batta for a long time before appearing in concert with it. In solitude, as is befitting honeymooners, we avoided interfering company until then. . . While all other instruments I had played prior to the Batta differed one from the other in character and range, I knew their qualities, shortcomings, or their capriciousness enough to exploit their good capabilities to full advantage. Not so with the Batta, whose prowess had no limitations. Bottomless in its resources, it spurred me on to try to reach its depths, and I have never worked harder or desired anything more fervently than to draw out of this superior instrument all it has to give."

The Batta-Piatigorsky Stradivarius is generally regarded as being among Stradivari's finest cellos, along with the Duport Stradivarius, the Davidov Stradivarius and the Servais Stradivarius. It is on display in a glass case at the Metropolitan Museum of Art in New York City.
