= Adolphe d'Houdetot =

19th-century French writer

- Born: César François Adolphe d'Houdetot; 31 August 1799; Le Havre
- Died: 30 July 1869 (aged 69); Le Havre
- Occupation: Writer

César François Adolphe d'Houdetot (31 August 1799 – 30 July 1869) was a 19th-century French writer, author of numerous books on hunting.

== Biography ==
The son of general César Louis d'Houdetot, he joined the administration under Louis-Philippe and became a particular collector in the financial administration of Le Havre. In 1848, he prepared the boarding measures of the King and Queen for a sea cruise, which would be the subject of his book Honfleur et le Havre, huit jours d'une royale infortune (1850).

His books were regularly published until today. The latest edition of his Chasseur rustique, illustrated by Horace Vernet, was published in 2000.

He also contributed to the writing of the comédie-vaudeville Le Coup de pistolet in 1828 with Charles de Livry, presented at Théâtre des Variétés 17 March 1828.

== Works ==
- 1828: Le Coup de pistolet, comédie-vaudeville in 1 act, with Charles de Livry
- 1844: Types militaires français
- 1844: Le Tir au pistolet, causeries théoriques
- 1850: Honfleur et le Havre, huit jours d'une royale infortune
- 1852: Système-Fontenau pour les armes à percussion. Notice historique sur l'origine et les progrès de cette découverte, with Eugène Talbot
- 1852: Le Chasseur rustique contenant la théorie des armes, du tir et de la chasse au chien d'arrêt, en plaine, au bois, au marais, sur les bancs
- 1853: Dix épines pour une fleur, petites pensées d'un chasseur à l'affût
- 1855: La petite vénerie ou La chasse au chien courant, drawings by Horace Vernet
- 1855: Chasses exceptionnelles, galerie des chasseurs illustres
- 1857: Le Tir au fusil de chasse, à la carabine et au pistolet, petit traité des armes à l'usage des chasseurs
- 1858: Braconnage et contre-braconnage
- 1859: Les Femmes chasseresses
- 1862: Nouveau porte-amarre
- 1864: Canon porte-amarres à rayure-fente

== Bibliography ==
- Louise Élisabeth Vigée-Le Brun, Souvenirs de Madame Vigée Le Brun, vol.2, 1869, p. 302
- Gustave Vapereau, Dictionnaire universel des contemporains, 1870, p. 917
- Camille Dreyfus, André Berthelot, La Grande encyclopédie, 1886, p. 307
- Hippolyte Buffenoir, La Comtesse d'Houdetot: sa famille, ses amis, 1905, p. 20
- Louis Cario, Charles Régismanset, La pensée française: anthologie des auteurs de maximes du XVIe siècle à nos jours, Mercure de France, 1921, p. 266
