= Octave Féré =

French writer

- Born: Charles Octave Moget; 11 October 1815; Tours
- Died: 21 April 1875 (aged 59); Paris
- Occupation: Writer

Octave Féré, real name Charles Octave Moget, (11 October 1815 – 21 April 1875) was a minor 19th-century French writer.

Féré contributed to the magazine L'Omnibus and also participated to the writing of many plays by the dramatist Saint-Yves, including for example Les Amours du comte de Bonneval in 1866.

== Works ==
- Légendes et traditions de la Normandie. Rouen: C. Haulard. 1845.
- Les Inondations de 1856. Paris: H. Boisgard. 1856.
- Les Mystères de Rouen. 1861.
- Les Sept Étoiles de Bohême. Paris: J. Tardieu. 1864.
- Toussaint Baubet. 1864.
- L'Homme au masque de fer. Paris. 1876.
