= Max Raoul =

French playwright (c. 1770 - 1839)

Max Raoul or Vandière, real name Raoul François Chapais, (c.1770 – 5 March 1839, Paris) was a 19th-century French playwright.

A former employee at the customs in Rouen, his plays were presented on several Parisian stages of the 19th century, including the Théâtre du Palais-Royal, the Théâtre du Gymnase-Dramatique, and the Théâtre du Vaudeville.

== Works ==
- 1804: La Voix du parterre
- 1817: L'Original et la copie, tales
- 1821: L'Amant bossu, comédie-vaudeville in 1 act, with Eugène Scribe and Mélesville
- 1827: Recette pour marier sa fille, comédie-vaudeville in 1 act, with Mélesville
- 1832: Une Affaire d'honneur, comédie-vaudeville in 1 act
- 1832: La Prise de voile, drama in 2 acts, mingled with songs
- 1834: Le Château d'Urtuby, opéra comique in 1 act, with Gabriel de Lurieu and Henri-Montan Berton
- 1835: Dolly ou Le cœur d'une femme, drama in 3 acts, with Thomas Sauvage and de Lurieu
- 1839: Mme de Brienne, drama in 2 acts, with Saint-Yves
