= Jean-Baptiste Gondelier =

French playwright and librettist

Jean-Baptiste Gondelier (8 December 1792 in Dijon – 31 October 1878) was a 19th-century French playwright and librettist.

== Biography ==
An engraver and lithographer at 110 Passage du Caire in the 2nd arrondissement of Paris, Jean-Baptiste Gondelier received a patent in letters on 12 September 1828. A widow in 1820 of Anne-Françoise-Esther Morisset, he remarried on 25 September 1824 with Joséphine Foliot.

The publisher, among others, of the Constitutionnel and the Gazette des théâtres, He permanently ceased his activities as a printer-lithographer on 8 July 1852. His plays were presented at the Théâtre du Vaudeville and the Théâtre des Variétés.

He married Marie Rosine Palmyre Blancvillain. He died in Laon, Aisne, in 1878.

== Works ==
- 1826: Le Dilettante, ou le Siège de l'Opéra, folie-vaudeville in five little acte, à propos du Siège de Corinthe, with Emmanuel Théaulon and Théodore Anne, music by Pierre-Louis Hus-Desforges, at the Théâtre du Vaudeville (6 November)
- 1826: La Mère au bal et la fille à la maison, two-act comédie en vaudevilles, with Emmanuel Théaulon, at the Théâtre du Vaudeville (30 November)
- 1826: Paris et Bruxelles, ou le Chemin à la mode, two-act comedy in vaudevilles, with Emmanuel Théaulon and Étienne Crétu, at Theatre des Variétés (4 December)
- 1827: Le Courrier des théâtres, ou la Revue à franc-étrier, folie-vaudeville in five relais, with Théodore Anne and Emmanuel Théaulon, at Théâtre du Vaudeville (24 February)
- 1827: La Girafe, ou Une journée au jardin du Roi, tableau-à-propos in vaudevilles, with Emmanuel Théaulon and Théodore Anne, at Théâtre du Vaudeville (7 July)
- 1827: Faust, lyrical drama in three acts after the tragedy by Goethe, lyrics by Théaulon and Gondelier, music by Philippe-Alexis Béancourt, at the Théâtre des Nouveautés (27 October)
