= Jean-Baptiste-Pierre Lafitte =

French playwright, novelist and journalist (1796–1879)

- Born: 2 June 1796; Bayonne, France
- Died: 6 March 1879 (aged 82); Paris, France
- Occupations: Playwright, novelist, journalist, comedian

Jean-Baptiste-Pierre Lafitte (2 June 1796 – 6 March 1879) was a 19th-century French playwright, novelist, journalist and comedian.

A pensionnaire of the Comédie-Française, his plays were presented on the most important Parisian stages of his time including the Théâtre du Vaudeville, the Théâtre français, the Théâtre de l'Ambigu-Comique, and the Théâtre des Variétés.

== Works ==
- 1826: Une aventure de Charles V, comedy in 1 act
- 1831: L'Amitié des femmes, comedy in 1 act and in verse
- 1831: Les Sybarites, ou les Francs-maçons de Florence, lyrical drama in 3 acts
- 1832: Almanach du département des Landes pour l'année 1832
- 1832: Voltaire et Madame de Pompadour, comedy in 3 acts, with Charles Desnoyer
- 1832: Jeanne Vaubernier ou la cour de Louis XV, comedy in 3 acts, with Michel-Nicolas Balisson de Rougemont and Augustin Lagrange
- 1834: Tout chemin mène à Rome, comédie-vaudeville in 1 act, with Desnoyer
- 1835: Naissance et mariage, comédie-vaudeville in 1 act, with Eugène Cormon
- 1835–1838: Mémoires de Fleury, de la Comédie française, 1757 à 1820, 2 vol.
- 1836: Madeleine la sabotière, comédie vaudeville in 2 acts, with Jean-François-Alfred Bayard and Desnoyer
- 1836: Un serment de femmes, vaudeville in 1 act, with Cormon
- 1836: Valérie mariée, ou Aveugle et jalouse, drama in 5 acts, with Desnoyer
- 1840: Lauzun, comédie-vaudeville in 2 acts, with Michel Masson and X.-B. Saintine
- 1841: Le Tailleur de la Cité, vaudeville in 2 acts, with Masson and Saintine
- 1840–1841: Les Trois Marie, 2 vol., with Michel Masson
- 1844: Le docteur rouge, novel, 3 vol.
- 1845: Le Gage du roi, novel
- 1845: Le Gantier d'Orléans, histoire du XVIe siècle
- 1846: L'Angelus, drama in 5 acts and 6 tableaux, with Adolphe d'Ennery
- 1846: Un conte bleu, comédie-vaudeville in 1 act, with Frédéric Thomas
- 1847: Le Mari anonyme, comédie-vaudeville in 2 acts, with d'Ennery
- 1852: Le Pour et le contre, comedy in 1 act and in prose, with Eugène Nyon
- 1856: Lisette, vaudeville in 1 act

== Bibliography ==
- Gustave Vapereau, Dictionnaire universel des contemporains, 1870, p. 1030
- Alfred Mézière, Lettres, sciences, arts: Encyclopédie universelle du XXe, 1908, p. 36
