= Jocko ou le Singe du Brésil =

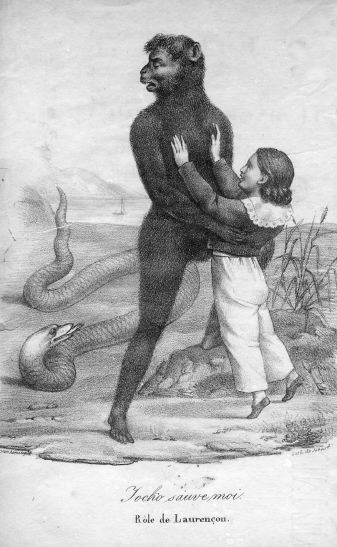
Laurençon in Jocko (Brussels, 1826).

Jocko ou le Singe du Brésil (Jocko or the Monkey of Brazil) is a two-act play by Edmond Rochefort, inspired by a novel of Charles de Pougens (1824).

== Plot ==
A rich Portuguese man travelling to Brazil captures a monkey which, during the Atlantic crossing, saves the man's child from shipwreck and dies in doing so. In the second production the public demanded that the monkey survive.

== Ballet ==
The play gave rise to a ballet by Frédéric-Auguste Blache, with music by Alexandre Piccinni and sets by Pierre-Luc-Charles Cicéri. The ballet was first put on at the Théâtre de la Porte Saint-Martin on Wednesday, 16 March 1825. Its main interpreters were Charles-François Mazurier and Louise Pierson.

The success of the ballet, a true bridge between the Enlightenment and Romanticism, was so great that many theatres in Paris and the French provinces put on the original version or competing works inspired by the same theme. There were over 160 productions in a single year. The Duchesse de Berry assisted in the first production in person, and the success was such that many things, such as dresses, fans, hairstyles and even a type of bread were nicknamed "jocko." It was revived three times that year and had many imitators. Jules Perrot, also in 1825, put on his version at the Théâtre de la Gaîté, entitled Sapajou.

Filippo Taglioni, March 12, 1826, staged his choreographed Danina ou Jocko le Singe brésilien at the Stuttgart Ballet, with Marie Taglioni, music by Peter von Lindpaintner. Taglioni's libretto tells of Danina in the forest saving Jocko from a snake attack, and later Jocko rescuing Danina from kidnappers.

The year 1826, Jean-Antoine Petipa put on his version at the Théâtre de la Monnaie, with Laurençon in the lead rôle. Also, Antoine Titus put it on in Berlin.

Jocko ou le singe du Brésil saw a long success, even being put on the municipal theatre in Tunis at the end of the century. It was one of the precursors for the 20th-century fashion for tales of humanised monkeys like King Kong and Planet of the Apes.
