= Eugène Fillot =

Eugène Fillot (? – 4 August 1862 in Paris) was a 19th-century French playwright.

His plays were presented at the Théâtre de Montmartre (of which he was managing director in 1838–1839), the Théâtre de l'Ambigu-Comique and the Théâtre de la Gaîté.

== Works ==
- 1836: Le Camarade de chambrée, comédie en vaudevilles in 1 act, with Mathieu Barthélemy Thouin
- 1836: Les Petits métiers, tableau populaire in 1 acte, mingled with couplets, with Thouin
- 1837: L'École de danse à 75 centimes le cachet, tableau-vaudeville in 1 act, with Thouin
- 1837: Les Pages du Czar, ou Lequel des deux ?, comédie en vaudevilles in 1 act, with Thouin
- 1838: La barrière des martyrs, prologue in 1 act, with Thouin
- 1843: Cantatrice et marquise, comédie en vaudeville in 3 acts, with Thouin
- 1847: Les filles d'honneur de la reine, comédie en vaudevilles in 1 act, with Thouin
- 1851: Henri le Lion, drama in 6 acts and 2 periods, with Louis-Nicolas Brette Saint-Ernest
- 1851: Un vendredi, comédie en vaudevilles in 1 act
- 1853: Le Roi, la dame et le valet, comédie en vaudevilles in 3 acts, with Thouin

== Sources ==
- Joseph Marie Quérard, La littérature française contemporaine. XIXe siècle, 1848, (p. 498)
