= Henri-Louis Blanchard =

French playwright, composer, violinist and critic (1778-1858)

- Born: 7 February 1778; Bordeaux
- Died: 18 September 1858 (aged 80); Paris
- Occupations: playwright, composer, violinist, music critic.

Henri-Louis Blanchard (7 February 1778 – 18 December 1858) was a French playwright, composer, violinist and music critic.

== Biography ==
The son of a violinist, he studied with Franz Beck in Bordeaux, Rodolphe Kreutzer, Méhul and Reicha at the Conservatoire de Paris. As soon as 1836, he participated, among numerous publications, at the Revue et gazette musicale de Paris in which he published his essais biographiques until 1856

Conductor of the Théâtre des Variétés from 1824 to 1829, he took part as librettist to some plays presented at the Théâtre-Français and also composed for the Théâtre du Gymnase or the Théâtre du Vaudeville more than three hundred melodies. He also put into music most of the texts by the poet Béranger He also wrote romances, canons for four, six and eight voices, duets for violin, viola quartets, concertos, a fugue for three violins, a fantasy for harp and violin etc.

In 1830 he became managing director of the Théâtre de Molière, a position he would keep until he died in 1858.

== Works ==
- 1812: Le Soleil, romance
- 1812: La Lune, romance
- 1816: Clarisse et Lovelace, ou Le suborneur, pantomime in three acts, mixed with dialogue, after Samuel Richardson
- 1828: Galopade hongroise..., arranged for the piano
- 1830: Couplets chantés au banquet de l'artillerie de la Garde nationale, le 10 décembre 1830, lyrics and music
- 1831: Don Pedro, roi du Portugal, melodrama in three acts and four tableaux, by Jules-Édouard Alboize de Pujol, music
- 1831: Diana Vernon, comédie-vaudeville en 1 acte by Adolphe de Leuven and Auguste Pittaud de Forges, music
- 1831: Camille Desmoulins, ou Les partis en 1794, historical drama in five acts, with Julien de Mallian
- 1831: Henri-Montan Berton, membre de l'Institut

== Bibliography ==
- Joseph Marie Quérard, Félix Bourquelot, Charles Louandre, La littérature française contemporaine. XIXe siècle, 1842, p. 574-578 (Lire en ligne)
- Camille Dreyfus, André Berthelot, La Grande encyclopédie: inventaire raisonné des sciences, 1886, p. 1012
- Revue de Musicologie, 1967, p. 81
- Marie-Noëlle Colette, La Musique à Paris en 1830-1831: enquête, 1983, p. 88
- Paul Mironneau, Chansonnier Henri IV, Ed. du pin à crochets, 1999, p. 84
- Zdenko Silvela, A New History of Violin Playing, 2001, p. 312
