= Auguste-Louis-Désiré Boulé =

French playwright (1799–1865)

Auguste-Louis-Désiré Boulé (1 September 1799, in Paris – 3 July 1865, in Paris) was a 19th-century French playwright.

A secretary at the Théâtre des Variétés, his plays were presented on the most significant Parisian stages of his time including the Théâtre de l'Ambigu, the Théâtre de la Porte-Saint-Martin, the Théâtre du Panthéon and the Théâtre de la Gaîté.

== Works ==
- 1822: L'Inconnu, ou les Mystères, melodrama in 3 acts, with Morisot
- 1832: Les 20.000 francs, drama in 1 act mingled with songs, with Charles Potier
- 1833: La Fille du bourreau, folie-vaudeville in 1 act, with Potier
- 1834: Trois ans après, ou la Sommation respectueuse, drama in 4 acts, with Théodore Nézel
- 1835: Le bon ange, ou Chacun ses torts, drame-vaudeville in 1 act, with Eugène Cormon
- 1835: Le Facteur, ou la Justice des hommes, drama in 5 acts, with Charles Desnoyer and Potier
- 1835: La Tache de sang, drama in 3 acts
- 1836: Fanchette, ou l'Amour d'une femme, drame-vaudeville in 2 acts, with Potier
- 1836: Parce que, ou la Suite de Pourquoi ? , comédie-vaudeville in 1 act, with Potier
- 1836: Le Passé, ou A tout péché miséricorde, comédie-vaudeville en 1 act, with Cormon
- 1836: Le Prévôt de Paris (1369), drama in 3 acts, with Cormon
- 1837: L'honneur de ma mère, drama in 3 acts, with Rimbaut
- 1837: Rita l'espagnole, drama in 4 acts, with Chabot de Bouin, Desnoyer and Eugène Sue
- 1837: Le Domino bleu, comédie-vaudeville in 1 act, with Félix Dutertre de Véteuil
- 1837: Rose Ménard, ou Trop bonne mère, drama in 3 acts
- 1838: Adriane Ritter, drama in 5 acts, with Jules Chabot de Bouin
- 1839: Corneille et Richelieu, comédie-vaudeville in 1 act, with Rimbaut
- 1839: Giuseppo, drama in 5 acts, with Chabot de Bouin
- 1839: Paul Darbois, drama in 3 acts
- 1840: Denise, ou l'Avis du ciel, drama in 5 acts, with Rimbaut
- 1840: Paula, drama in 5 acts, with Chabot de Bouin
- 1841: Le Bourreau des crânes, vaudeville in 2 acts
- 1841: Paul et Virginie, drama in 5 acts and 6 tableaux, with Cormon
- 1842: Émery le négociant, drama in 3 acts, with Hippolyte Rimbaut
- 1843: Les Naufrageurs de Kérougal, drama in 4 acts, extravaganza, with Chabot de Bouin and Saint-Yves
- 1844: Jeanne, drama in 6 parts and 2 periods, with Chabot de Bouin and Saint-Ernest
- 1845: Les Enfants du facteur, drama in 3 acts
- 1845: Les Ruines de Vaudémont, drama in 4 acts, with Aristide Letorzec
- 1845: Stephen ou le fils du prescrit, drama in 4 acts, with Auguste Anicet-Bourgeois
- 1846: Les Trompettes de Chamboran, vaudeville in 3 acts and 4 tableaux, with Théodore de Lustières
- 1848: Les Œuvres du démon, melodrama in 5 acts, with Jules Brésil

== Bibliography ==
- Gustave Vapereau, Dictionnaire universel des contemporains, 1865, p. 245
