= Alphonse Signol =

French playwright and novelist

François-Nicolas Alphonse Signol (c.1800 in Saint-Mandé – 26 June 1830 in Vincennes) was an early 19th-century French playwright and novelist.

== Biography ==
His plays were presented on the most important Parisian stages of his time including the Théâtre des Variétés, the Théâtre des Nouveautés, and the Théâtre de l'Ambigu-Comique. His novel Le Commissionnaire is sometimes attributed to George Sand and Jules Sandeau who allegedly used his name for promotion.

He was killed in a duel against a military after an altercation at the Théâtre italien de Paris.

== Works ==
- 1826: De la maçonnerie considérée dans quelques-uns de ses rapports avec la politique
- 1828: Le Caporal et le Paysan, with Armand d'Artois
- 1828: Le Duel, drama in 2 acts
- 1828: Jean, play in three parts, mingled with couplets, with Emmanuel Théaulon
- 1828: L'École de natation, tableau-vaudeville in 1 act, with Adolphe de Leuven and Charles de Livry
- 1829: Apologie du duel, ou Quelques mots sur le nouveau projet de loi
- 1829: Le Pacha et la Vivandière, folie vaudeville in 3 tableaux
- 1830: La Lingère, ou la Vie de Paris en 1830, 5 vol.
- 1830: Mémorial de Sir Hudson Lowe, relatif à la captivité de Napoléon
- 1831: Le Chiffonnier, 5 vol., with Stanislas Macaire
- 1831: Le Commissionnaire, mœurs du XIXe

== Bibliography ==
- Joseph Marie Quérard, La France littéraire ou dictionnaire bibliographique des savants, vol.8, 1838, p. 136
- Louis Gabriel Michaud, Biographie universelle, vol.82, 1849, p. 236-237
- Pierre Chevallier, Histoire de la Franc-Maçonnerie française, 1974
- François Guillet, La Mort en face : Histoire du duel en France, 2010
