= Fabrice Labrousse =

French playwright

- Born: 21 September 1806; Cahors
- Died: 22 August 1876 (aged 69); Ville d'Avray
- Occupation: playwright

Fabrice Labrousse (21 September 1806 – 22 August 1876) was a 19th-century French playwright. He was the grandfather of the dramatist Fabrice Carré (1855–1921).

== Works ==
=== Theatre ===
- 1838: Le Chevalier du Temple, drama in five acts by F. Labrousse and Albert, Théâtre de l'Ambigu-Comique (14 April)
- 1839: La Nuit du meurtre, drama in five acts by F. Labrousse and Albert, Ambigu-Comique (3 August)
- 1839: Le Lion du desert, melodrama in three acts by Ferdinand Laloue and Fabrice Labrousse, Cirque-Olympique (27 November)
- 1842: Le Prince Eugène et l'Impératrice Joséphine, drama in three acts by Ferdinand Laloue and Fabrice Labrousse, Cirque-Olympique (17 December)

=== Librettos ===
Le 15 Août, cantata, music by Alfred Brillant, Théâtre du Prince Impérial.

=== Essais ===
- Lettre politique ou Courte réponse à de nombreuses accusations, Paris, Guillaumin, 1833.
- Fabrice Labrousse, J. Marty et B. Blaisot (dir.), Annales du théâtre, ou Galerie historique des principaux auteurs et acteurs, par une société de gens de lettres et d'artistes, Paris, Blaisot, 1833.
