= Jean-Baptiste Blache =

French-German ballet dancer

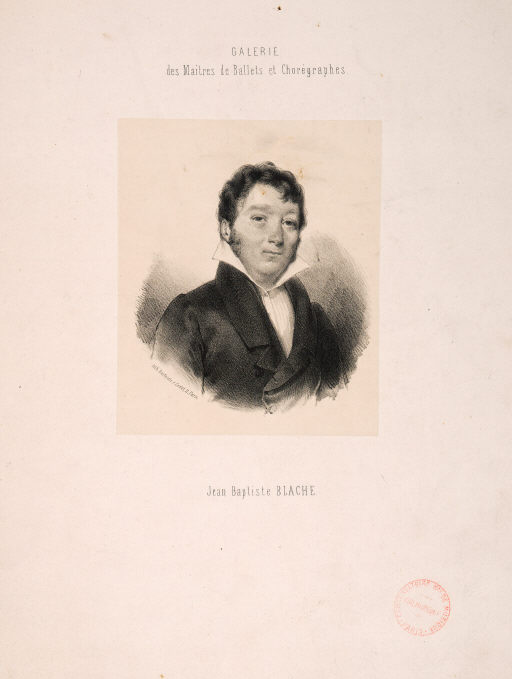
Jean-Baptiste Blache, anonymous engraving (c. 1830). Paris, BNF (Gallica).

Jean-Baptiste Blache de Beaufort (17 May 1765, in Berlin – 24 January 1834, in Toulouse) was a French-German ballet dancer and ballet teacher.

== Life and Career ==
Blache was born in Berlin on 17 May 1765 of French parents. The family moved to Paris so that Blache could study with Jacques François Deshayes.

Blache learned the violin and cello, undertaking a largely provincial career. Working mainly from Bordeaux, where he succeeded Jean Dauberval, he had a brief tenure at the Opéra de Paris, where he put on The Barber of Seville (1806) and Les Fêtes de Vulcain (1820).

Among his best-known ballets are Les Meuniers (1787), which was praised by Arthur Saint-Léon, L'Amour et la Folie, La Chaste Suzanne, La Fille soldat, and Almaviva et Rosine (1806).

Blache retired in Toulouse but declined an offer from the local theatre to become its ballet master.

== Family ==
His eldest son, Frédéric-Auguste Blache (1791- ?) revived his father's work at the Théâtre de la Porte Saint-Martin from 1816 to 1823, then at the Ambigu-Comique, where he revived the La Fille soldat. Frédéric-Auguste also wrote Polichinelle vampire, interpreted by Charles-François Mazurier (1823) and Jocko ou le Singe du Brésil (1825). Jean-Baptiste's younger son, Alexis-Scipion (1792-1852), later himself became ballet master at Lyon, Paris, Marseille, Bordeaux and St-Petersburg.
