= Edmond Rochefort =

French writer, dramatist, vaudevillist and songs writer

Edmond Rochefort, full name Claude-Louis-Marie de Rochefort-Luçay (Évaux-les-Bains, 1790 – Paris, April 1871), was a French writer, dramatist, vaudevillist and songs writer. His only play that was met with some success is Jocko ou le Singe du Brésil, presented at the Théâtre du Vaudeville in Paris.

He was son of Lieutenant-Colonel François-Louis, comte de Rochefort, and his wife, Catherine-Françoise le Bel de la Voreille.

Rochefort wrote a book, Mémoires d'un vaudevilliste in which he recounts his adventures in La Réunion and the literary relationships he had with some writers of his time. In 1819 he was private secretary of Monsieur Millius, Governor of the Reunion Island. But lacking the necessary training, he returned to France in 1822 to marry Marie-Nicole Morel. He also authored a report Sur l'Ile de Bourbon et de Madagascar which was delivered to the Minister of the Navy and the original of which is in the O.M Archives in Aix-en-Provence.

He had 4 children: Caroline, Palmyra, Emilia and the famous Henri. Caroline, good at painting, was supporting the family by making many copies for the State (sources: family archives). He died in the most abject poverty in a catholic congregation of the rue du Faubourg-Saint-Antoine (filles de la Charité de Nevers).

As a creative author, he wrote under several pseudonyms: Armand de Rochefort, Edmond Rochefort, Rochefort.

Rochefort-Luçay was the father of the famous journalist and polemicist Henri Rochefort. Most biographers assign him the marquis title. However, the letters patent of the King and the Accounts Chamber have never been found. However, his grandfather, Gabriel Jean Dominique, was indeed baron Coulanges of the province of Berry (Lury-sur-Arnon parish) (deed of sale of Coulanges in 1763 to M. de Plusquellec). The Dictionnaire universel de la noblesse de France, by Jean Baptiste Pierre Jullien de Courcelles, gives Gabriel Jean Dominique de Rochefort the title of Marquis de Rochefort; his father, Pierre, was son of Dominique de Rochefort, comte de Luçay et de Menetreau. The title of marquis was apparently bestowed in April 1619, with the family being thus 'comtes et marquis de Rochefort et de Pleuvaut, et de la Boulaye', as well as 'barons et comtes de Luçay'. Gabriel Jean Dominique de Rochefort became head of the family when his uncle, Charles, died without issue. This volume refers to Claude-Louis-Marie de Rochefort as 'comte de Rochefort'.

== Selected works (in collaboration) ==
- 1820: Le Diable d'Argent, revue in 1 act and in vaudevilles, with Armand d'Artois,
- 1822: Le Départ d'une diligence, tableau épisodique in 1 act, with Mathurin-Joseph Brisset,
- 1825: Les Singes, ou la Parade dans le salon, vaudeville in 1 act, with Mathurin-Joseph Brisset,
- 1826: Jocko ou le Singe du Brésil (Jocko or the Monkey of Brazil), two-act play,
- 1826: La pêche de Vulcain, ou L'île des fleuves, vaudeville, with Mathurin-Joseph Brisset,
- 1828: Les cuisiniers diplomates, vaudeville in 1 act, with Michel Masson and Barthélemy Jarnet,
- 1829: L'Audience du juge de paix, ou le Bureau de conciliation, tableau in 1 act, with Charles de Livry,
- 1830: Madame Grégoire ou Le cabaret de la Pomme de pin, vaudeville in 2 acts, with Charles Rondeau,
- 1833: L'Aspirant de marine, opéra comique in 2 acts, with Alexis Decomberousse,
- 1836: Le Comédien de salon, with Achille d'Artois
- 1837: La Folie Beaujon ou l'Enfant du mystère, vaudeville in 1 act, with Charles Dupeuty
