= Louis-Émile Vanderburch =

French writer and playwright (1794–1862)

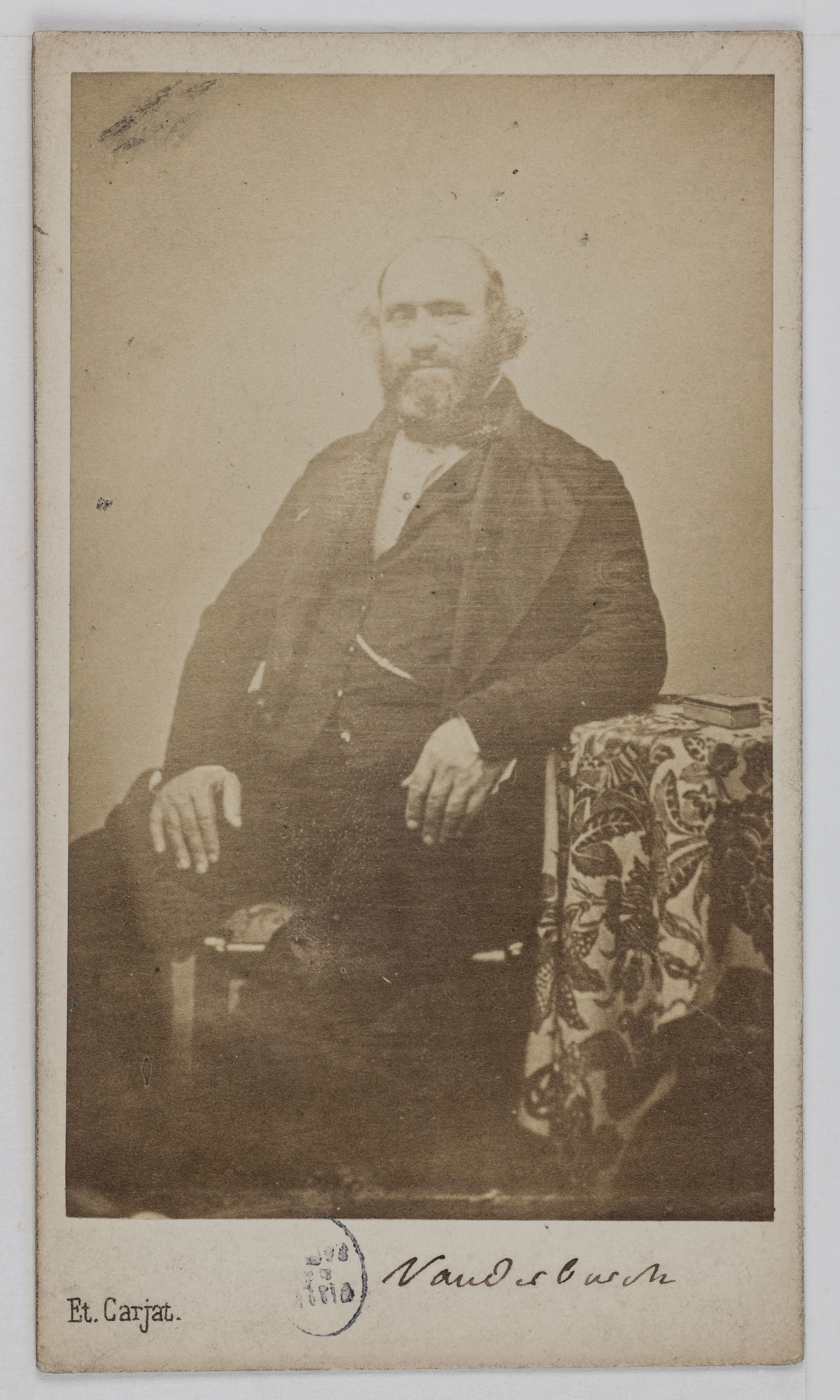
- Born: 30 September 1794; Paris, France
- Died: 30 March 1862 (aged 67); Rueil-Malmaison, Paris, France
- Occupations: Writer, playwright

Louis-Émile Vanderburch (30 September 1794 – 30 March 1862) was a 19th-century French writer and playwright. The painter Dominique Joseph Vanderburch (1722–1785) was his grandfather.

== Biography ==
After he started a career in teaching as a professor of history, Vanderburch turned to literature and more specifically to theatre. From 1816, he authored more than a hundred theatre plays, some of which were met with great success.

From 1836 to 1853, he lived in the Petit château of La Chapelle-Saint-Mesmin (Loiret) which now houses the city hall of this town of 10,000 inhabitants.

== Works ==
Theatre (selection)

- 1835: Jacques II
- 1836: Le Gamin de Paris
- 1838: Clermont, ou Une femme d'artiste (with Eugène Scribe)
- 1838: Peau d'âne
- 1846: Une nuit au Louvre
- 1854: Le Sanglier des Ardennes
- 1855: Le sergent Frédéric, comédie en vaudevilles (with Dumanoir)

Other

- 1816: L'Épingle noire
- 1847: Scènes contemporaines laissées par Madame la Vicomtesse de Chamilly, Urbain Canel, 1828 collective pseudonym of François-Adolphe Loève-Veimars, Auguste Romieu and Vanderburch.
- 1832: Souvenirs de France, d'Écosse et d'Angleterre pendant les règnes de François I, Henri II, François II, Marie Stuart et Elisabeth.
- 1841-1843: Le Gamin de Paris à Alger.
- 1851: Histoire militaire des Français. À l'usage des écoles régimentaires et des écoles communales.

== Bibliography ==
- Émile Chevalet, Les 365. Annuaire de la littérature et des auteurs contemporains, 1858.
- Charles Vander-Burch Fils, Biographie d'un homme de lettres, Imprimerie veuve Théolier Ainé et Cie, In-8°, 19 pages, Saint-Etienne, 1863, published by the Bnf, available Here

== Funds Vanderburch ==
From a gift of Philippe Collin, his great-nephew, the Émile Vanderburch funds gathers at the Bibliothèque nationale de France (Department of Performing Arts) personal papers, the manuscripts of 9 unpublished plays and 8 published plays, 4 collections of poetry and songs, 3 handwritten works of his youth, intimate writings, correspondence, programs, documents related to his theatrical activity and press articles.
