= Léon Lévy Brunswick =

French playwright (1805–1859)

Léon-Lévy Brunswick
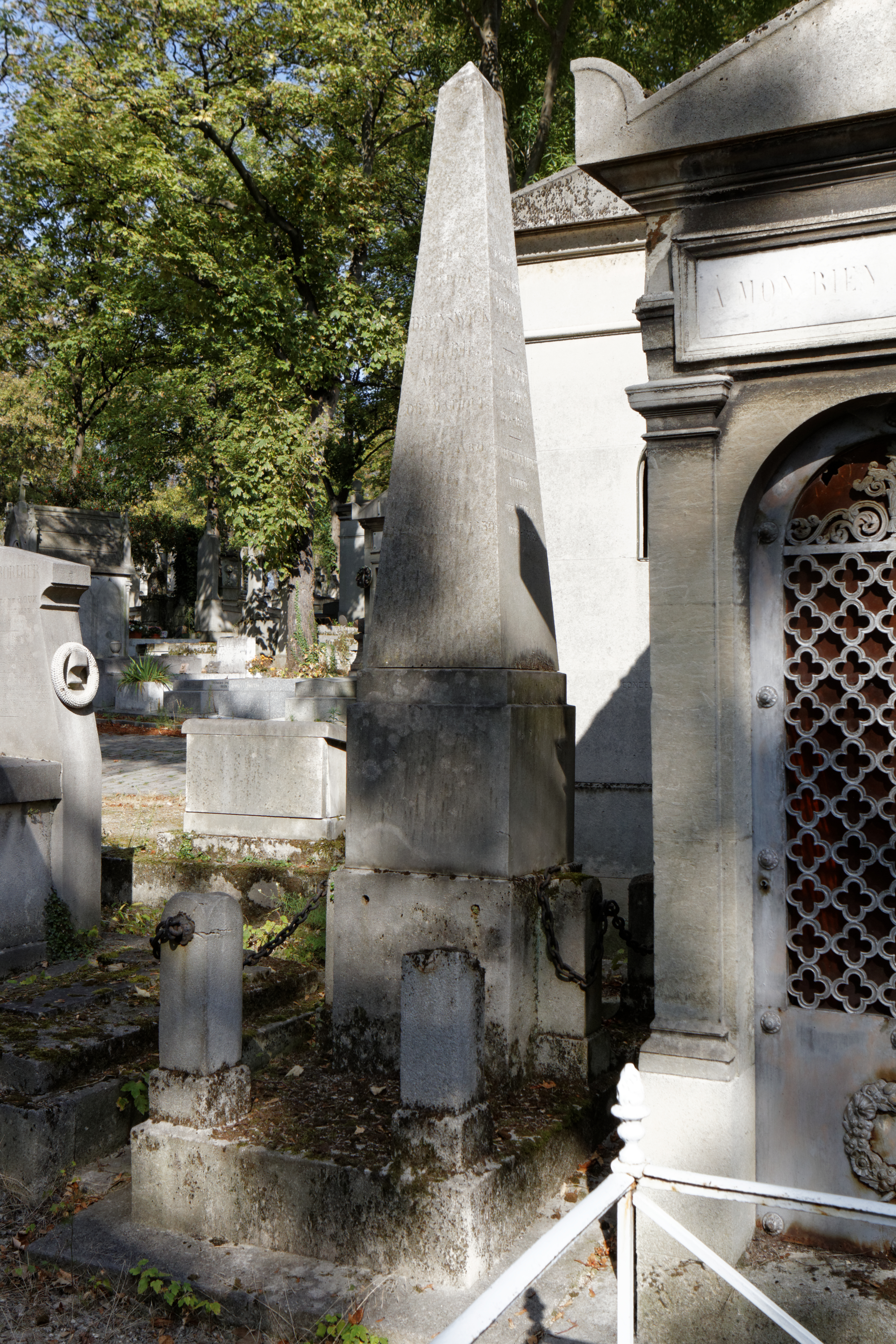
- Born: 20 April 1805; Paris
- Died: 29 July 1859 (aged 54); Le Havre
- Occupations: Librettiste, journalist, writer, dramatist

Léon Lévy Brunswick (20 April 1805, in Paris – 29 July 1859, in Le Havre) was a French playwright. He started as a journalist before turning to theater. He is the author of many comedies with Jean-François Bayard, Louis-Émile Vanderburch, and Arthur de Beauplan such as Boccaccio, or the Prince of Palmero by Franz von Suppé. But it is with Adolphe de Leuven that he is known for his greatest successes, notably booklets of comic operas by Adolphe Adam (Le Brasseur de Preston, Le Postillon de Lonjumeau, Le Roi d'Yvetot). He has also published under the pseudonym of Leo Lhérie.

== Selected works ==
- With Adolphe de Leuven: Le mariage au tambour. Comédie en trois actes, mêlée de chant. (Théâtre français en prose. Series 4, 8.) Velhagen & Klasing, Bielefeld 1855, OCLC 758710646.
- With Adolphe de Leuven, Adolphe Adam, Carl Friedrich Wittmann: Der Postillon von Lonjumeau. Komische Oper in drei Aufzügen. (Reclams Universal-Bibliothek, 2749.; Opernbücher in Reclams Universal-Bibliothek, 12.; Reclams Universal-Bibliothek/Opernbücher, 12.) Reclam, Leipzig um 1920, OCLC 174800475.
