= Jules-Édouard Alboize de Pujol =

French historian and playwright (1805–1854)

Jules-Édouard Alboize de Pujol (1805, Montpellier – 9 April 1854, Paris) was a French historian and playwright. Director of the Théâtre de l'Atelier in Montmartre, Alboize Pujol wrote several dramas and comedies, either alone or in collaboration.

== Selected works ==
=== Publications ===
- Christiern de Danemark, ou les masques noirs, with Paul Foucher, Paris, Marchant, 1836.
- La Guerre des servantes, a drama in five acts and seven tableaux, with Charles Emmanuel Theaulon and Jean Harel, 26 August 1837.
- L’Idiote, a drama in three acts and in prose, performed in the Théâtre de la Porte-Saint-Antoine, 2 December 1837, Paris, JN Barba, 1837.
- Le Tribut des cent vierges, Bernard Lopez, E. Duverger, performed at the Théâtre de la Gaîté, Paris, Sn, 1841.
- Marie Simon, a drama in five acts, with Saint-Yves, Paris, 1852.
- Les Chevaux du carrousel, ou le Dernier jour de Venise, a drama in five acts, with Paul Foucher, Paris, Dondey Widow Dupre [S. d.].

=== Librettos ===
- Tabarin, with Georges Bousquet and Andrel, Paris, Grus, v. In 1852.

=== History ===
- Histoire de la Bastille depuis sa fondation (1374) jusqu’à sa destruction (1789), with Arnold Auguste and Auguste Maquet, Paris, Library Administration, 1840.
- Description pittoresque de la succursale de l’hôtel royal des invalides à Avignon, with Arnoult and Maquet, Avignon, Bonnet sons, 1845.
- Les Prisons de l’Europe, with Auguste Maquet, Paris, Library Administration, 1845.
- Fastes des Gardes nationales de France, Paris, Goubaud and Olivier, 1849.

== Bibliography ==
- This article is based on the translation of the corresponding article of the French Wikipedia. A list of contributors can be found there at the History secttion.
