= Madame Angot's Daughter (film) =

1935 film

- Directed by: Jean Bernard-Derosne
- Written by: Jean Bernard-Derosne; Jean-Jacques Bernard
- Based on: Madame Angot's Daughter by Clairville, Paul Siraudin and Victor Koning
- Starring: André Baugé; Jean Aquistapace; Raymond Cordy
- Cinematography: Lucien Joulin; Jacques Montéran
- Music by: Charles Lecocq
- Production company: Société Française de Productions Cinématographiques
- Release date: 11 October 1935
- Running time: 85 minutes
- Country: France
- Language: French

Madame Angot's Daughter (French: La fille de Madame Angot) is a 1935 French musical comedy film directed by Jean Bernard-Derosne and starring André Baugé, Jean Aquistapace and Raymond Cordy. It also featured early screen appearances by Arletty and Madeleine Robinson. It is based on the 1872 comic opera Madame Angot's Daughter.

The film's sets were designed by the art director Jean Douarinou.

== Cast ==
- André Baugé as Ange Pitou
- Moniquella as Clairette Angot
- Jean Aquistapace as Larivaudière
- Raymond Cordy as Louchard
- Madeleine Guitty as Amaranthe
- Arletty as Ducoudray
- Danièle Brégis as Mademoiselle Lange
- Robert Arnoux as Pomponnet - Un coiffeur
- Henri Marchand as Antonin
- William Aguet as Trénitz
- Raymond Rognoni as Cadet
- Georges Colin as Jérôme
- Sinoël as Le maire
- Pierre Labry as Buteux
- Odette Talazac as Cydalise
- Germaine Reuver as Thérèse
- Marcelle Sarret as Babet
- Nane Germon as Hersilie
- Pierre-Louis as L'amoureux
- Madeleine Robinson as L'amoureuse

== Bibliography ==
- Goble, Alan. The Complete Index to Literary Sources in Film. Walter de Gruyter, 1999.
