= Beauvallet (surname) =

Beauvallet is a surname, and may refer to:

- Léon Beauvallet (1828–1885), French actor, playwright and novelist
- Pierre-François Beauvallet (1801–1873), French actor and playwright
- Pierre-Nicolas Beauvallet (1750–1818), French sculptor
