= Armand Lapointe =

French novelist, journalist and playwright (1822–1910)

- Born: Amant Théodore Lapointe; 1 May 1822; Paimbœuf, Loire-Atlantique, France
- Died: 6 March 1910 (aged 87); 9th arrondissement of Paris, France
- Occupations: Novelist, journalist, playwright

Armand Lapointe (1 May 1822 – 6 March 1910) was a French novelist, journalist and playwright. He also wrote the libretto of the opérette bouffe Mesdames de la Halle by Jacques Offenbach.

== Biography ==
He was a prolific popular author in the years 1850–1890 and still remembered at the time of his death.

During the Second French Empire, his comedies were given in Paris, at the Théâtre des Variétés and his opéra bouffe was produced at the Théâtre des Bouffes-Parisiens. From 1860, Lapointe was devoted mainly to writing novels. He was a friend of Gustave Aimard, with whom he would attend the Goguette du Poulet sauté.

== Works ==
- 1852: La Course à la veuve, folie-vaudeville en 1 act
- 1853: Les Drames du foyer, with F. de Reiffenberg fils
- 1853: Les moustaches grises, vaudeville in 1 act, with Achille Bourdois and Émile Colliot
- 1853: Le mari par régime, comédie en vaudevilles in 1 act, with Bourdois and Colliot
- 1853: Mélez-vous de vos affaires, vaudeville in 1 act, with Bourdois and Colliot)
- 1854: Un provincial qui se forme, comédie en vaudeville in 1 act, with Colliot and H. Mareuge, Beck
- 1854: A la recherche d'un million, comédie en vaudevilles in 1 act, with Colliot and H. Mareuge, Beck
- 1857: Le Bazar européen, revue-vaudeville in 1 act
- 1857: Avez-vous besoin d'argent ?, parody of La Question d'argent, with Paul Siraudin and Bourdois
- 1858: Dalila et Samson, histoire en 5 feuillets, mixed with distincts, with Eugène Grangé
- 1858: Faust et Framboisy, drame burlesque in 3 acts and 11 tableaux, with Bourdois
- 1858: Mesdames de la Halle, opéra bouffe in 1 act, music by Jacques Offenbach, with Josef Heinzelmann
- 1859: Les deux maniaques, comédie en vaudevilles in 1 act, with Colliot and Adolphe Choler
- 1859: Les Dames de Coeur-Volant, opéra bouffe in 1 act, with Bourdois
- 1860: Les Parisiennes. La comtesse Jeanne,
- 1860: Voyage à la recherche du bonheur, (in Le Musée des familles, issue 15)
- 1868: La dernière douairière, (published as a serial)
- 1870: Les flibustiers du grand monde
- 1875: La vie parisienne
- 1876: La chasse aux fantômes
- 1878: Les déserts africains : aventures extraordinaires d'un homme, d'un singe et d'un éléphant, with Henri de Montaut
- 1878: Les rivalités : le docteur Jacques Hervey
- 1879: Bataille d'amoureuses
- 1880: Reine du faubourg
- 1881: Reine coquette
- 1881: L'abandonnée, (published as a serial in Le Petit Parisien in 1877)
- 1882: Le cousin César, (foreword by Jules Claretie)
- 1884: Feu Robert-Bey
- 1884: La princesse : roman parisien
- 1884: Le roman d'un médecin,
- 1885: Madame Margaret : histoire parisienne, Plon
- 1886: L'enjôleuse
- 1886: Les galères de l'amour
- 1887: Les Mémoires de Valentin
- 1888: La fille repentie
- 1888: Reine de nuit
- 1889: Les étoiles filantes, roman parisien
- 1889: Le Don Quichotte de la mer, aventures de terre et de mer
- 1894: Petite guerre, comédie de salon in 1 act
- 1896: Les sept hommes rouges
- 1901: Le fils du Boër
- Le bonhomme misère, Plon
