= Victor Koning =

French playwright and librettist

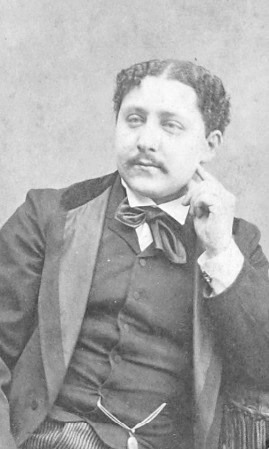
- Victor Koning
- Born: 4 April 1842; Belleville, France
- Died: 1 October 1894 (aged 52); Suresnes, France
- Occupations: Playwright, librettist
- Spouses: Jane Hading (m. 1884; div. 1888): Raphaële Sisos

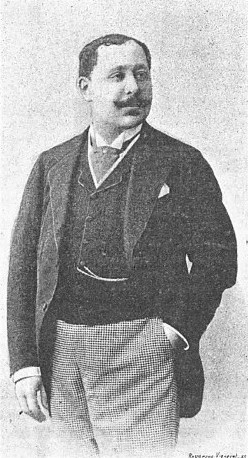
Victor Koning by Georges Camus.

Victor Koning (4 April 1842 – 1 October 1894) was a French playwright and librettist.

== Biography ==
He authored theatre plays, mostly comedies and comédie en vaudeville and successful operettas libretti including La Fille de madame Angot (1872) by Charles Lecocq which he wrote in collaboration with Clairville and Paul Siraudin.

Victor Koning was also managing director of the Théâtre de la Gaîté from 1 April 1868 to 13 March 1869 and of the Théâtre de la Renaissance from 1875 to 1882.

On 19 June 1884 in Marylebone (England), he married the actress Jane Hading, who he helped make her debut at the Théâtre du Gymnase the previous year in Le Maître de forges, a huge theatrical and literary success. They divorced in 1888. On 27 May 1893, he married a second time with the actress Raphaële Sisos The writers Jules Clarétie and Auguste Vacquerie, Eugène Bertrand, director of the Opéra de Paris, and Arthur Meyer, director of Le Gaulois, were witnesses at the act.

In July 1894, he suffered a stroke. Some days later, the Gil Blas informed its readers that

Mr. Victor Koning, former director of the Gymnase and the Comédie-Parisienne, who had been seriously ill, is recovering and it is hoped that soon he will not feel almost more suites of the violent dizziness that had recently hit him

But his health was getting worse. In Le Temps dated 8 September, it read that

Mlle Raphaële Sisos left Paris yesterday to go to Marseille where she has to give a series of performances. As for Mr. Koning, whose state is less satisfactory, he is for a few days in treatment in Suresnes in doctor Meyan's health home.

It is in this facility that he died three weeks later. He was buried on 4 October in the Montparnasse Cemetery.

== Works ==
=== Theatre ===
- 1867: Les Plaisirs de Paris ou 1867, revue in four acts and twenty-five tableaux by Koning, Saint-Agnan Choler and Adolphe Choler, Théâtre de la Porte-Saint-Martin
- 1872: La revue n'est pas au coin du quai, review in four tableaux by Koning, Siraudin and Clairville, Théâtre des Variétés
- 1872: La Cocotte aux œufs d'or, féérie in three acts and twelve tableaux by Koning, Clairville and Eugène Grangé, Théâtre des Menus-Plaisirs
- 1873: La Fille de madame Angot, opéra comique in three acts by Koning, Siraudin and Clairville, music by Charles Lecocq, Théâtre des Folies-Dramatiques
- 1873: Canaille et Compagnie, drama in five acts and ten tableaux by Koning, Siraudin and Clairville, Théâtre de l'Ambigu-Comique
- 1876: On demande une femme honnête, comédy in one act by Koning and Aurélien Scholl, Théâtre des Variétés

=== Texts ===
- 1864: Les Coulisses parisiennes, foreword by Albéric Second, E. Dentu, Paris
- 1866: Voyage autour du demi-monde, foreword by Théodore Barrière, E. Dentu, Paris
- 1872: Tout Paris, foreword by Henry de Pène, E. Dentu, Paris
