= Léon Beauvallet =

French actor, playwright and novelist (1828–1885)

- Born: Pierre-Léon-Charles Beauvallet; 22 August 1818; 10th arrondissement of Paris
- Died: 22 March 1885 (aged 56); 10th arrondissement of Paris
- Occupations: Playwright, actor, novelist

Léon Beauvallet, full name Pierre-Léon-Charles Beauvallet, (22 August 1828 – 22 March 1885) was a 19th-century French actor, playwright and novelist.

Author of numerous plays, most of them written in collaboration, as well as feuilletons published in Le Passe-Temps before publication in print, he is best known for being part of the troupe who accompanied Rachel Félix to the United-States and Cuba in 1855. The account he gave of this odyssey, first published in Le Figaro under the title Rachel et le Nouveau-Monde, had some success and was translated into English upon its release in 1856.

Léon Beauvallet was Pierre-François Beauvallet's son and Frantz Beauvallet's father, both dramatists.

== Works ==
=== Theatre ===
- Le Roi de Rome, drama in 5 acts and 10 tableaux, with Charles Desnoyer, Théâtre de l'Ambigu-Comique, 13 June 1850
- Les Femmes de Gavarni, « scènes de la vie parisienne », 3 actes and a masquerade mingled with couplets, with Théodore Barrière and Adrien Decourcelle, Théâtre des Variétés, 3 June 1852
- Sur Terre et sur mer, comedy in 1 act mingled with song, Ambigu-Comique, 22 January 1854
- Le Paradis perdu, drama in 5 acts mingled with song, with Henry de Kock, Théâtre Beaumarchais, 9 September 1854
- La Mariée est trop belle, comédie-vaudeville in 1 act, with Henry de Kock, Théâtre du Palais-Royal, 25 June 1855
- Le Guetteur de nuit, opérette bouffe in 1 act, with Amédée de Jallais, Théâtre des Bouffes-Parisiens, 30 August 1856
- Les Princesses de la rampe, comedy in 2 acts mingled with song, with Lambert-Thiboust, Variétés, 26 February 1857
- Je ne mange pas de ce pain-là, comédie-vaudeville in 1 act, with Marcel Nouvière, Palais-Royal, 4 September 1857
- La Filleule du chansonnier, drama in 3 acts mingled with song, with Saint-Agnan Choler after the songs by Pierre-Jean de Béranger, Ambigu-Comique, 1 November 1857
- Ninon et Ninette, vaudeville in 1 act, with Amédée de Jallais and Marcel Nouvière, Théâtre des Folies-Dramatiques, 5 October 1858
- Les Moissonneurs de Rome, drama in 1 act, Théâtre des Jeunes-Artistes, 26 April 1864
- Le Crime de Faverne, drama in 5 acts and 7 tableaux, with Théodore Barrière, Ambigu-Comique, 6 February 1868
- Le Sacrilège, drama in 5 acts, eight tableaux, with Théodore Barrière, Ambigu-Comique, 23 Octobre 1868
- Les Quatre Henri, ou la Destinée, historical drama in 6 acts, Ambigu-Comique, 5 June 1869
- Bruxelles qui rit, revue-féerie in 5 acts and 18 tableaux, with Marc Leprévost, Théâtre royal du Parc, Bruxelles, 6 February 1870
- Le Fils d'une comédienne, drama in 5 acts by Léon and Frantz Beauvallet, Théâtre de Cluny, 17 December 1873
- L'Amant de la lune, drama in 5 acts and 7 tableaux, with Paul de Kock, Ambigu-Comique, 17 May 1874
- Les Femmes de Paul de Kock, pièce fantastique in 5 acts and 9 tableaux by Léon and Frantz Beauvallet, Théâtre Déjazet, 17 June 1874
- Le Tour du monde en 80 minutes, « voyage fantaisiste » in 3 acts and 5 tableaux, Théâtre Déjazet, 15 November 1874
- Auguste Manette, drama in 5 acts and 6 tableaux, with Alexis Bouvier, Théâtre des Arts, 26 January 1875
- La Mère Gigogne, play in 5 acts and 10 tableaux mingled with song, with Victor Koning, Théâtre du Château-d'Eau, 5 February 1875
- Le Papillon du Marais, comedy in 1 act, mingled with song by Léon and Frantz Beauvallet, Athénée-Comique, 1 October 1876
- La Vicomtesse Alice, drama in 5 acts and 8 tableaux, with Albéric Second, Théâtre des Nations, 28 September 1882

=== Texts ===
Novels

- 1864:Les Drames de Montfaucon
- 1870: Les Pendus de Montfaucon : Les Mystères de la rue des Marmousets
- 1871: Les Pendus de Montfaucon : Les Secrets du capitaine Buridan
- 1872: Les Nuits royales, suite des Secrets du capitaine Buridan
- 1879: Suce-canelle, ou les Trois Faubouriennes, with Frantz Beauvallet and Saint-Vrin, at Gallica
- 1881: Le Crime de la place Saint-Jacques, roman de mœurs contemporaines, with Frantz Beauvallet, at Gallica
- 1888: Milord l'Arsouille
- 1893: Mlle d'Artagnan, with Frantz Beauvallet

Other

- 1856: Rachel et le Nouveau-Monde, promenade aux États-Unis et aux Antilles, at Gallica
- 1861: Les Femmes de Murger, with Louis Lemercier de Neuville
- 1862: Les Femmes de Victor Hugo, with Charles Valette

== Bibliography ==
- Pierre Larousse, « Léon Beauvallet », Grand dictionnaire universel du XIXe siècle, tome 2, Paris, 1867, (p. 452), at Gallica
