= Lambert-Thiboust =

French playwright

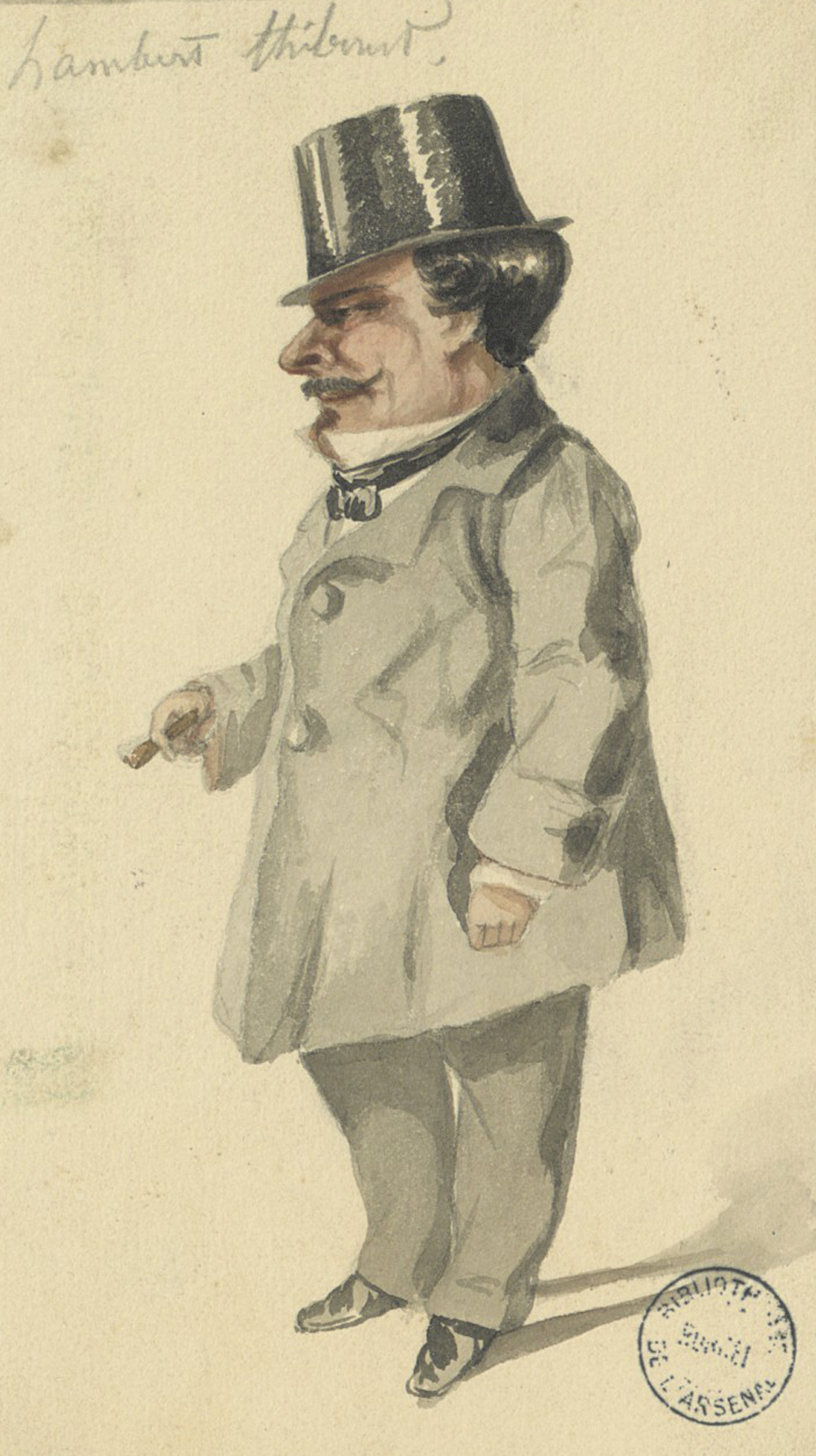
- Lambert-Thiboust par Lhéritier
- Born: Pierre-Antoine-Auguste Thiboust; 25 October 1827; 2nd arrondissement of Paris
- Died: 10 July 1867 (aged 39); 17th arrondissement of Paris
- Occupation: Playwright,

Lambert-Thiboust (25 October 1827 – 10 July 1867) was a 19th-century French playwright.

== Biography ==
Lambert-Thiboust began his career as a comedian. He won a prize for tragedy at the Paris Conservatoire in 1848 and briefly pursued acting at the Théâtre de l'Odéon. His first play, L'Hôtel Lambert, a one-act comedy, was presented at the Odeon the same year. In 1850, his three-act play L'Homme au petit manteau bleu, gained real success.

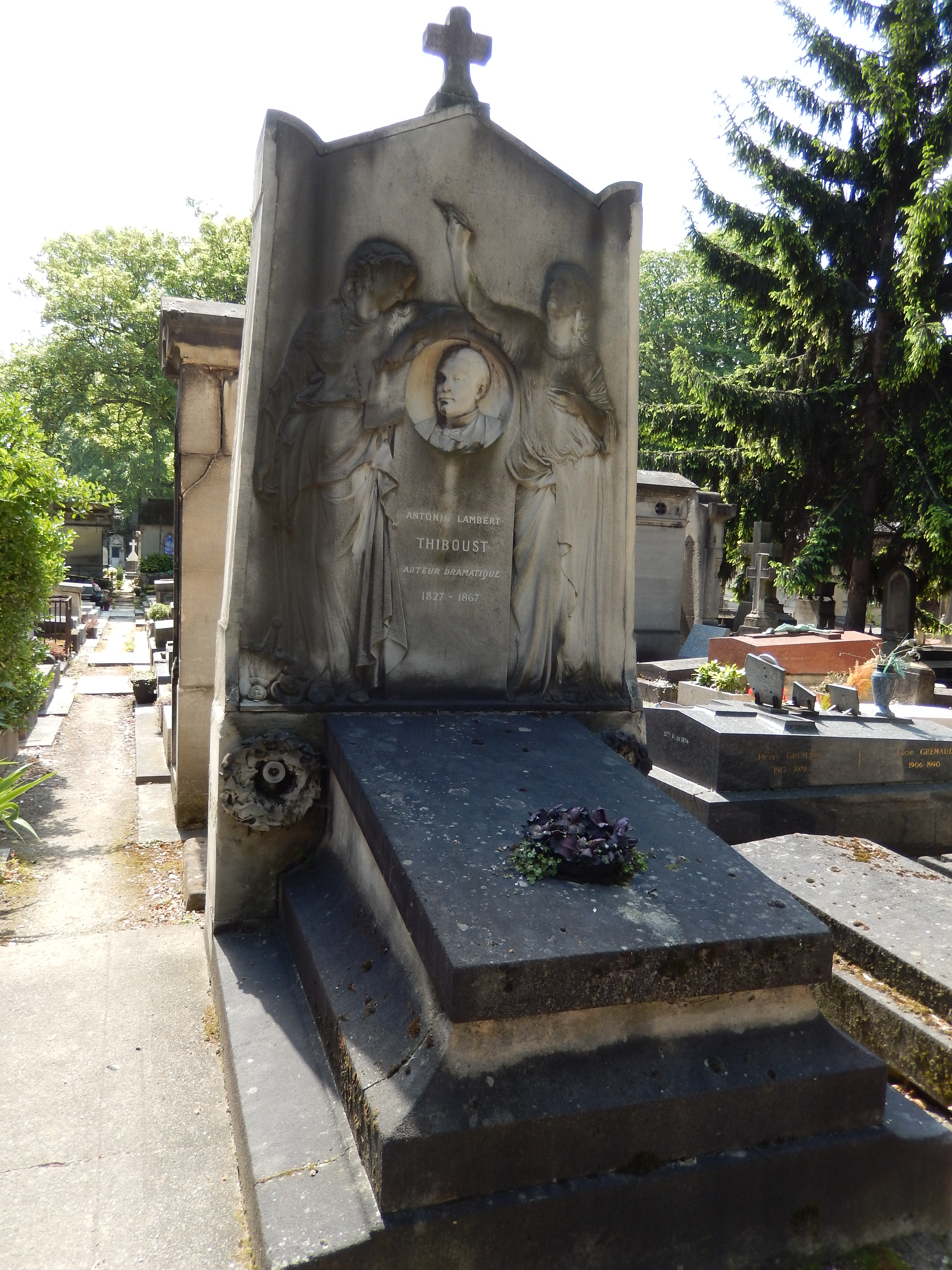
Lambert Thiboust's grave (Montmartre cemetery, division 27)

During the next 20 years, alone and with such collaborators as Alfred Delacour, Théodore Barrière, Clairville, Adrien Decourcelle, Henri de Kock, Paul Siraudin, Ernest Blum, Eugène Grangé and Frédéric Charles de Courcy, he wrote a hundred plays, comedies, vaudevilles and dramas, many of which were successful.

== Honors ==
- Chevalier de la Légion d'honneur au titre du Ministre de la Maison de l'Empereur et des Beaux-Arts (12 August 1864 decree). Parrain : Camille Doucet, of the Académie française

== Selected works ==
- 1848: L'Hôtel Lambert, comedy in 1 act Théâtre de l'Odéon (5 March)
- 1850: L'Homme au petit manteau bleu, play in 3 acts
- 1850: Les Trois Dondon, Comédie en vaudevilles in 1 act with Alfred Delacour Théâtre du Vaudeville (10 July)
- 1850: Les Rubans d'Ivonne, comedy in 1 act mixed with song with Henri de Kock, Théâtre de la Gaîté (28 September)
- 1851: Le Diable, drama in 6 acts with Delacour, Théâtre de la Porte-Saint-Martin (26 April)
- 1851: La Corde sensible, comédie en vaudevilles in 1 act with Clairville, Théâtre du Vaudeville (8 October)
- 1852: Paris qui dort, scènes de la vie nocturne in 5 acts with Delacour, music by Pierre-Julien Nargeot and Auguste Bazille, Théâtre des Variétés (21 February)
- 1853: Les Filles de marbre, drama in 5 acts mingled with singing with Théodore Barrière Théâtre du Vaudeville (17 May)
- 1853: Les Mystères de l'été, comédie en vaudevilles in 5 acts with Delacour, music by Nargeot, Théâtre des Variétés (9 June)
- 1853: Les Enfers de Paris, in 5 acts with Roger de Beauvoir Théâtre des Variétés (16 September)
- 1853: L'Amour, qué qu'c'est que ça ?, comédie en vaudevilles in 1 act with Clairville and Delacour Théâtre des Variétés (6 April)
- 1853: Diane de lys et de camélias, ou la Femme du monde légère, liée à un homme bilieux qui n'entend pas la plaisanterie, great parody in 3 little tableaux with Delacour Théâtre des Variétés (7 December)
- 1854: Les Oiseaux de la rue, scènes populaires in 3 acts and 4 tableaux with Delacour Théâtre des Variétés (6 January)
- 1854: Le Cabaret du Pot-Cassé, comédie en vaudevilles in 3 acts with Clairville, music by Jules Bariller, Théâtre du Vaudeville (22 September)
- 1855: Le Quart de monde, ou le Danger d'une particulière pleine de malice pour un individu vraiment impressionnable, parody du demi-monde, étude réaliste mêlée de couplets et d'effets de style with Clairville, Théâtre des Variétés (18 April)
- 1855: Un bal d'Auvergnats, comédie en vaudevilles in 1 act with Paul Siraudin and Delacour, Théâtre du Palais-Royal (5 April)
- 1855: Je dîne chez ma mère, comedy in 1 act mingled with couplets with Decourcelle, Théâtre du Gymnase-Dramatique (31 December)
- 1856: Le Tueur de lions, comédie en vaudevilles in 1 act with Lehmann, Théâtre du Palais-Royal (15 February)
- 1856: Madame Lovelace, play in 3 acts, Théâtre du Vaudeville (22 February)
- 1857: Les Princesses de la rampe, comedy in 2 acts mingled with singing with Léon Beauvallet, music by Nargeot, Théâtre des Variétés (26 February)
- 1859: Rosalinde ou Ne jouez pas avec l'amour, comedy in 1 act with Aurélien Scholl, Théâtre du Gymnase (1 July)
- 1860: La Fille du diable, féerie-vaudeville in 5 acts and 8 tableaux with Clairville and Siraudin, music by Nargeot, Théâtre de l'Ambigu-Comique (9 June)
- 1860: La Petite Pologne, drama in 5 acts with Ernest Blum, Théâtre de la Gaîté (29 June)
- 1861: Le Crétin de la montagne, drama in 5 acts and eight tableaux with Eugène Grangé, Théâtre de la Gaîté (3 June)
- 1862: Un mari dans du coton, comédie en vaudevilles in 1 act, Théâtre des Variétés (6 April)
- 1862: Les Poseurs, comedy in 3 acts with Jules Duval, Théâtre des Variétés (17 March)
- 1863: Le Secret de Miss Aurore, drama in 5 acts and 8 tableaux with Bernard Derosne, music by Degroot, Théâtre du Châtelet (3 July)
- 1864: L'homme n'est pas parfait, tableau populaire in 1 act, Théâtre des Variétés (1 January)
- 1865: Les Jocrisses de l'amour, comedy in 3 acts, with Théodore Barrière, Théâtre du Palais-Royal (31 January)
- 1865: Le Supplice d'un homme, comédie en vaudevilles in 3 acts, with Grangé, Théâtre du Palais-Royal (12 July)
- 1865: La Marieuse, comedy in 2 acts, with Charles de Courcy, Théâtre du Gymnase (17 October)
- 1865: La Voleuse d'enfants, drama in 5 acts and 8 tableaux, with Grangé, Théâtre de l'Ambigu-Comique (6 May)
- 1866: La consigne est de ronfler, comédie en vaudevilles in 1 act mingled with couplets, with Grangé, Théâtre du Palais-Royal (1 February)
