= Adolphe Choler =

French playwright and librettist

Adolphe Joseph Choler (1821 – 19 January 1889) was a French playwright and librettist who was born in and died in Paris. He was Saint-Agnan Choler's brother. His plays were presented on the most important Parisian venues of the 19th century: Théâtre de la Porte Saint-Martin, Théâtre des Variétés, Théâtre du Palais-Royal, Théâtre du Gymnase-dramatique etc. He was managing director of the Théâtre du Palais-Royal from 1868 to 1879.

== Works ==
- 1842: Eva ou le Grillon du foyer, comédie en vaudevilles in 2 acts, with Saint-Yves
- 1847: Mademoiselle Grabutot, vaudeville in one act, with Saint-Yves
- 1848: Candide ou Tout est pour le mieux, conte mêlé de couplets in 3 acts and 5 tableaux, with Clairville and Saint-Yves
- 1848: La république de Platon, vaudeville in 1 act, with Saint-Yves
- 1849: Madame veuve Larifla, vaudeville in 1 act, with Labiche
- 1849: Le Marquis de Carabas et la princesse Fanfreluche, tale by Perrault in 1 act, mixed with distichs, with Adolphe d'Ennery
- 1849: La paix du ménage, comédie en vaudevilles in 1 act, with Saint-Yves
- 1850: Charles le Téméraire, comédie en vaudevilles in 1 act, with Saint-Agnan Choler and Auguste Lefranc
- 1851: Belphégor, vaudeville fantastique in 1 act, with Dumanoir, Saint-Yves
- 1851: La Fille de Frétillon, vaudeville in 1 act, with Saint-Yves
- 1851: Le Mari d'une jolie femme, comédie en vaudevilles in 1 act, with Saint-Yves
- 1852: Le terrible savoyard, folie-vaudeville in 1 act, with the Cogniard brothers
- 1852: Le Bal de la Halle, à-propos-vaudeville in 2 acts, with Clairville
- 1852: Cinq gaillards, dont deux gaillardes, mêli-mêlo, mixed with one distinct, with Lefranc and Siraudin
- 1852: Marie Simon, drama in 5 acts, with Jules-Édouard Alboize de Pujol and Saint-Yves
- 1852: Prunes et chinois, vaudeville in 1 act, with Hippolyte Cogniard
- 1854: L'Enfant de la halle, drama-vaudeville in 3 acts, with Saint-Agnan Choler and Eugène Vachette
- 1854: Gusman ne connait pas d'obstacles !, vaudeville in 4 acts, with the Cogniard brothers
- 1854: L'héritage de ma tante, comédie en vaudevilles in 1 act, with Saint-Yves
- 1854: Les marquises de la fourchette, vaudeville en 1 acte, avec Labiche
- 1855: La dame de Francboisy, historical vaudeville which didn't happen, with Siraudin
- 1855: Un cœur qui parle, comédie en vaudevilles in 1 act, with Nérée Désarbres
- 1857: La Gammina, parodie de La Fiammina, in 4 acts, preceded by Vingt ans avant, prologue, with Siraudin
- 1857: Le Nez d'argent, vaudeville in 1 act, with Delacour and Saint-Yves
- 1858: Le fils de la belle au bois dormant, féerie in 3 acts and 10 tableaux, with Lambert-Thiboust and Siraudin
- 1858: L'Avocat du diable, comedy in 1 act, with Marc Michel
- 1858: La Soirée périlleuse, comédie mêlée de couplets, in 1 act, with Marc Michel
- 1859: Amoureux de la bourgeoise !, vaudeville in 1 act, with Paul Siraudin
- 1859: Les Deux maniaques, comédie en vaudevilles in 1 acte, with Émile Colliot and Armand Lapointe
- 1859: Les Mêli-mêlo de la rue Meslay, comédie en vaudevilles in 1 act, with Marc Michel
- 1859: Note relative aux droits de Mozart et de Weber
- 1859: Paris s'amuse !, comédie en vaudevilles in 3 acts, with Saint-Agnan Choler
- 1859: Le rouge-gorge, vaudeville in 1 act, with Labiche
- 1860: Comment on gâte sa vie, comédie en vaudevilles in 3 acts, with Saint-Yves
- 1860: Fou-Yo-Po, a study of Chinese mores in 1 act, with Siraudin and Delacour
- 1860: J'ai perdu mon Eurydice, comédie en vaudevilles in 1 act, with Marc Michel
- 1861: Bébé-actrice, parody-vaudeville in 1 act, with Siraudin
- 1861: Deux nez sur une piste, comédie en vaudevilles in 1 act, with Marc Michel
- 1861: Les Rameneurs, vaudeville in 1 act, with Siraudin
- 1862: Après le bal, comedy in 1 act, mixed with distichs, with Alfred Delacour and Paul Siraudin
- 1862: Un avocat du beau sexe, comédie en vaudevilles in 1 act, with Siraudin
- 1862: Le Cotillon, à-propos mixed with distichs, with Clairville
- 1862: Les Finesses de Bouchavanes, comedy in 1 act, mixed with song, with Marc Michel
- 1864: Les Fiancés de Rosa, opéra comique in 1 act
- 1864: Les Pinceaux d'Héloïse, vaudeville in 1 act, with Henri Rochefort
- 1864: La Vieillesse de Brididi, vaudeville in 1 act, with Rochefort
- 1865: Une Dame du lac, comédie en vaudevilles in 1 act
- 1865: Une femme dégelée, vaudeville in 1 act, with Clairville and Saint-Yves
- 1865: Le Procès Van Korn, vaudeville in 1 act, with Rochefort
- 1866: Un pied dans le crime, comédie en vaudevilles in 3 acts, with Labiche
- 1867: Les chemins de fer, comédie en vaudevilles in 5 acts, with Alfred Delacour and Eugène Labiche
- 1867: L'Homme masqué et le Sanglier de Bougival, athletic and literary foly in 1 act, with the Cogniard brothers
- 1868: Mademoiselle Pacifique, comédie en vaudevilles in 1 act, with Saint-Yves
- 1883: Six demoiselles à marier, operetta bouffa in 1 act, with Léo Delibes

== Bibliography ==
- Louis Gustave Vapereau, Dictionnaire universel des contemporains, 1870, (p. 395)
- Octave Uzanne, Le Livre n°1, 1889, (p. 166) (obituary)
- T. J. Walsh, Second Empire Opera: The Théâtre Lyrique, Paris 1851-1870, 1981, (p. 345)
