= Eugène Grangé =

French playwright, librettist, chansonnier and goguettier

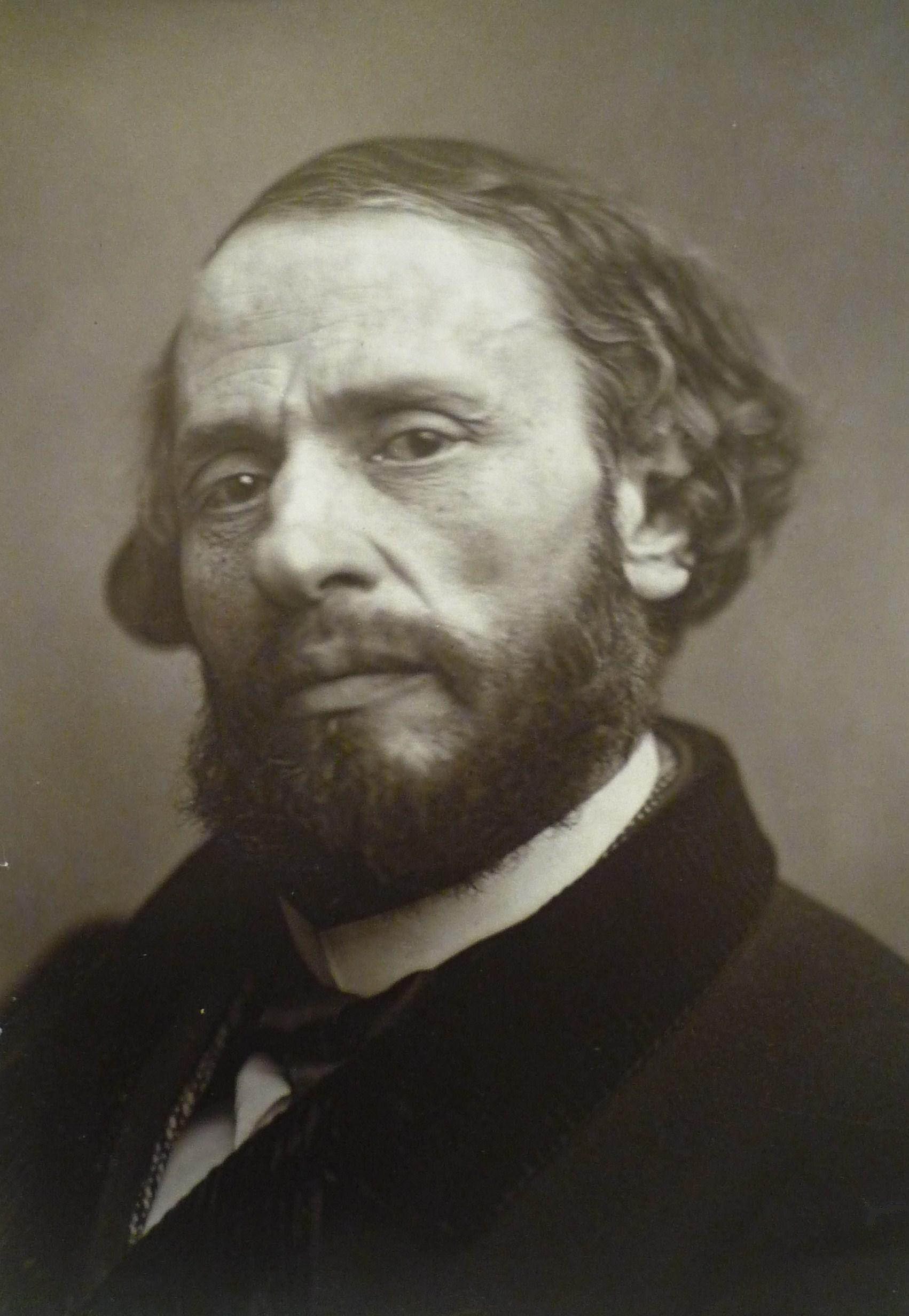
- Eugène Grangé, cliché Pierre Petit
- Born: Pierre-Eugène Basté; 16 December 1810; Paris
- Died: 1 March 1887 (aged 76); 9th arrondissement of Paris
- Occupations: Playwright librettist chansonnier goguettier
- Years active: 1828 – 1881
- Spouse: Sophie-Jenny Dubois

Eugène Grangé (16 December 1810 – 1 March 1887) was a French playwright, librettist, chansonnier and goguettier.

== Biography ==
The son of Pierre-Joseph Basté and Louise-Thérèse Grangé, Pierre-Eugène Basté was born in rue Beautreillis in Paris. He attended the school and the collège Charlemagne. After graduation, he began working in a banking house that he left to start a literary career. At 17, he found himself having comédies en vaudeville played in the small theaters of Boulevard du Temple. He would sign these pieces with his middle name, Eugène and his mother's surname. He became the favorite author of Théâtre des Funambules and of Mme Saqui's show. By that time, he was dubbed the "Scribe of the boulevard du Temple". As a consequence of his success, Mme Saqui wanted him to work exclusively for her. For a year or two, Grangé would be the sole - and highly paid - author of her theater.

In 1833, he gave the théâtre des Folies-Dramatiques a three-act play: Le Gamin, in collaboration with Lubize (1798-1863). Then, in 1836, he presented the théâtre des Variétés with Le Tour de faction, which was met with great success.

During his career, he addressed all genres: comedy, vaudeville, drama, féerie, year-end review.

Eugene Grangé was also a songwriter and a goguettier. He would participate to the monthly singing dinners of the Gnoufs-Gnoufs founded in 1858. Then, in May 1865 at the invitation and under the patronage of his friend Clairville, he joined the Fourth société du Caveau of which he eventually became a full member. He would be elected president seven times (1868, 1872, 1874, 1877, 1880, 1882 and 1884).

At the end of the year 1879, Louis Henry Lecomte evaluated Grangé's output to no less than 350 plays and 300 songs that were inserted into the magazine Le Caveau. In addition to these songs are 72 speeches in verse that he gave as president of the Caveau. In 1881, he wrote the foreword presentation of his friend Henri Fénée's songbook, like him a member of the Caveau.

Married to Sophie-Jenny Dubois, he died in his home at 54 rue Saint-Lazare in Paris.

== Œuvres ==
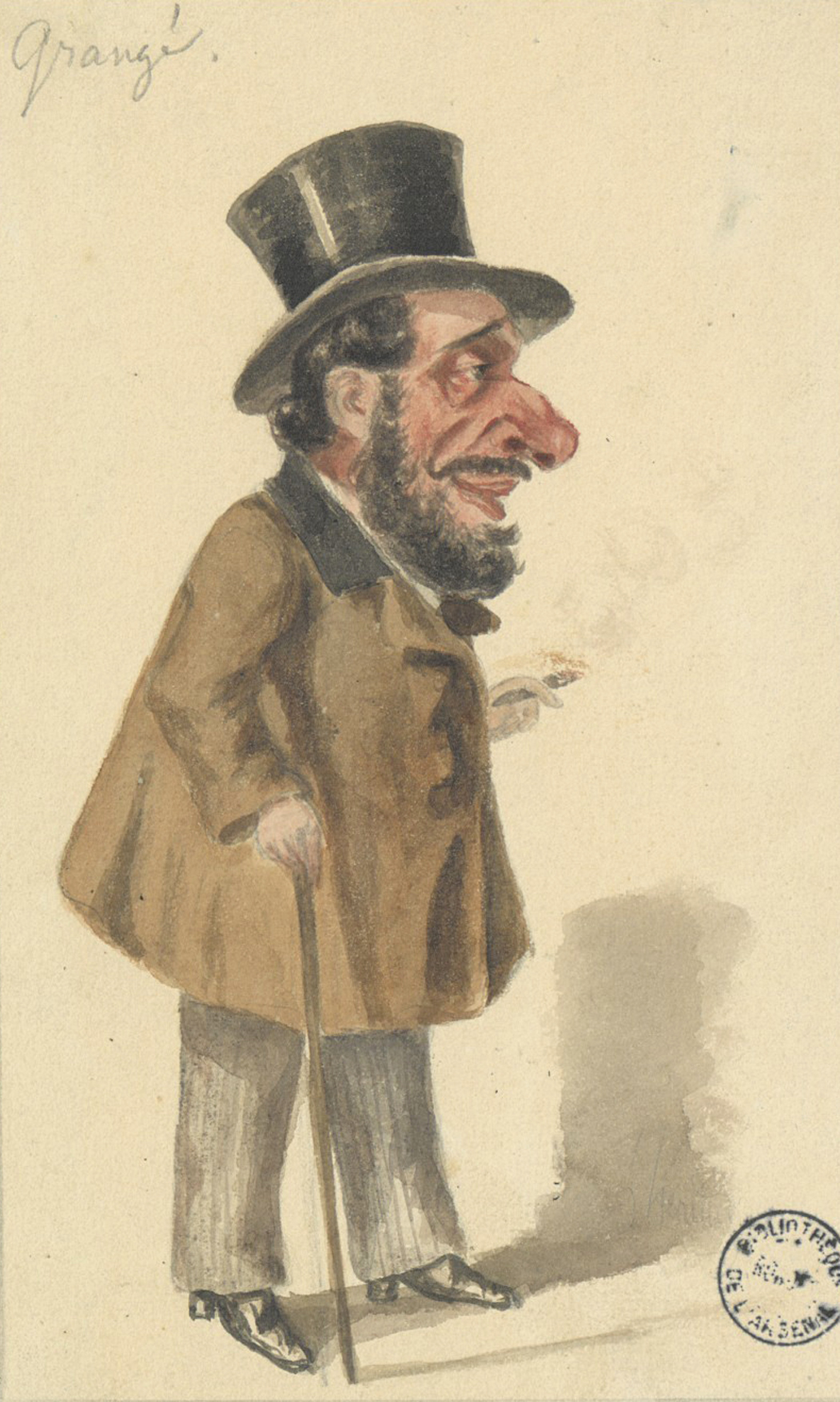
Eugène Grangé by Lhéritier

- 1843: Les Bohémiens de Paris, drama by Adolphe d'Ennery and Grangé, théâtre de l'Ambigu-Comique
- 1845: Constant-la-Girouette, comédie en vaudevilles in 1 act, with Jules-Henri Brésil
- 1853: Les Sept Merveilles du monde, féerie by Adolphe d'Ennery and Eugène Grangé, théâtre de la Porte-Saint-Martin
- 1853: Le Carnaval des Maris, comédie en vaudevilles MMr. Cormon and Eugène Grangé, théâtre des Folies-Dramatiques
- 1858: Le Punch Grassot, operetta by Eugène Grangé and Alfred Delacour
- 1860:
  - La Sirène de Paris, drama by Eugène Grangé and Xavier de Montépin
  - La Pénélope à la mode de Caen, operetta by Eugène Grangé, Paul Siraudin and Lambert-Thiboust
  - Les Mémoires de Mimi-Bamboche, vaudeville in 5 acts by Eugène Grangé and Lambert-Thiboust
- 1861:
  - La Mariée du Mardi-gras, operetta by Eugène Grangé and Lambert-Thiboust
  - La Beauté du diable, operetta by Eugène Grangé and Lambert-Thiboust
- 1862: La Boîte au lait, operetta by Eugène Grangé and Jules Noriac; transformed into an opéra-bouffe on a music by Jacques Offenbach in 1876
- 1865: Un clou dans la serrure, comédie en vaudevilles by Eugène Grangé and Lambert-Thiboust
- Before 1868: La Croqueuse de pommes, set in music by Louis Deffès
- 1873: La Cocotte aux œufs d'or, féerie by Hervé and Clairville, Eugène Grangé and Victor Koning
- 1878: Coco de Clairville, operetta by Eugène Grangé and Alfred Delacour
- 1881: Les Deux Roses, by Clairville, Victor Bernard and Eugène Grangé
