= Émile Colliot =

French playwright and poet

Émile Colliot (French: [emil kɔljo]; 12 January 1824, Chaumont, Haute-Marne – 24 January 1881) was a French playwright and poet of the 19th century.

His plays were presented at many Parisian stages of his time, including the Théâtre des Folies-Dramatiques, the Théâtre des Délassements-Comiques, and the Théâtre des Variétés.

== Works ==
- 1848: Amour et folie, drama in three acts
- 1848: La Mort d'André Vesale, soliloquy in 1 act and in verses
- 1849: Bruxelles, père, fils et compagnie, actualité vaudeville à grand spectacle, in 1 act and 2 tableaux
- 1849: Clara ou la Double épreuve, comédie en vaudevilles in 1 act
- 1849: Empereur et Savetier, historical vaudeville in 1 act
- 1849: Le Jugement de Dieu, drama vaudeville in 1 act
- 1849: La Politique des femmes, vaudeville in 1 act
- 1850: Plaisir et charité, vaudeville in 1 act
- 1851: 400,000 francs pour vingt sous, vaudeville in 1 act, with Émile Lefebvre
- 1851: Dans l'autre monde, rêverie vaudeville in 2 acts and 3 tableaux, with Émile Lefebvre
- 1851: Un fameux numéro, vaudeville in 1 act, with Paul Faulquemont and Hippolyte Lefebvre
- 1852: Alice, ou L'ange du foyer, comédie en vaudevilles in 1 act, with Saint-Yves
- 1852: L'Ami de la maison, comédie en vaudevilles in 1 act, with Émile Lefebvre
- 1852: L'Ami François, comédie en vaudevilles in 1 act, with Achille Bourdois
- 1852: La Course à la veuve, folie-vaudeville in 1 act, with Bourdois
- 1853: La Chanson du marteau, song
- 1853: Les Ombres blanches, poetry, with Jules Bertrand
- 1853: La Dernière heure d'un avare, soliloquy in 1 act
- 1853: Le Mari par régime, comédie en vaudevilles in 1 act, with Bourdois and Lapointe
- 1853: Mêlez-vous de vos affaires, vaudeville in 1 act, with Bourdois and Lapointe
- 1853: Les Moustaches grises, vaudeville in 1 act, with Bourdois and Lapointe
- 1854: A la recherche d'un million, comédie en vaudevilles in 1 act, with Armand Lapointe
- 1854: Un Provincial qui se forme, comédie en vaudevilles in 1 act, with Lapointe
- 1857: De l'Avenir du clergé catholique
- 1858: Hommage à S. M. Napoléon III d'un moyen d'obtenir le pain et le loyer à bon marché
- 1859: Les Deux maniaques, comédie en vaudevilles in 1 act, with Adolphe Choler and Lapointe
- 1864: A qui la pomme ?, fantaisie in 1 act
- 1864: Une Chanson de Béranger, vaudeville in 4 acts and 5 tableaux, with Bourdois
- 1864: Les Femmes du sport, tableau de mœurs, de salon et d'écurie, in 4 acts, with Bourdois
- 1866: La Vie à la vapeur, vaudeville fantastique in 4 acts and 6 tableaux, with Bourdois
- 1872: Pour la France, s'il vous plaît !, monologue
