= Saint-Agnan Choler =

French playwright (1820–1880)

Saint-Agnan Choler (Paris 12 March 1820 – Paris 30 May 1880) was a French playwright, Adolphe Choler's brother.

Choler studied at the collège royal de Charlemagne where he gained a prize in Greek theme

His plays were given on the most important Parisian stages of his time: Théâtre du Palais-Royal, Théâtre du Luxembourg, Théâtre du Gymnase, Théâtre de l'Ambigu-Comique etc.

== Works ==
- 1850: Charles le Téméraire, comédie en vaudevilles in 1 act, with Adolphe Choler and Auguste Lefranc
- 1854: L'Enfant de la halle, drama-vaudeville in 3 acts, with Adolphe Choler and Eugène Vachette
- 1857: La filleule du chansonnier, drama in 3 acts, mixed with song, after the songs by Béranger, with Léon Beauvallet
- 1859: Paris s'amuse !, comédie en vaudevilles in 3 acts, with Adolphe Choler
- 1861: Gare l'eau, review of 1860 in 3 acts and 5 tableaux
- 1861: Le Trou à la lune, fantasy play in 3 acts and 6 tableaux
- 1862: Bric-à-Brac et Cie, fantasy vaudeville in 3 acts and 6 tableaux
- 1862: Roule ta bosse !, review in 3 acts and 7 tableaux
- 1863: Cocher! A Bobino, review in 3 acts and 9 tableaux
- 1864: Tir' toi d'là, review in 3 acts and 10 tableaux
- 1865: V'lan ! ca y est !, review of the year in 3 acts
- 1866:Entrez ! Vous êtes chez vous !, play in 4 acts and 5 tableaux, preceded by Le Théâtre de l'avenir, opening prologue in 2 tableaux
- 1866: Je me l'demande, review of the year 1866, in 10 tableaux
- 1872: A qui le tablier ?, vaudeville in 1 act
- 1873: La Famille Guignol, vaudeville in 1 act
- 1873: Faut du prestige, vaudeville in 1 act
- 1874: Bobinette, vaudeville in 1 act
- 1875: Mon Collègue, one-act play
- 1875: Tous dentistes !, one-at play
- 1877: La boite à Bibi, vaudeville in 3 acts, with Alfred Duru
- 1877: Le Bouillon de la mariée, vaudeville in 1 act
- 1877: Les Tragédies de Paris, drama in 5 acts and 10 tableaux, from the novel by Xavier de Montépin
- 1878: L'Accordeur, vaudeville in 1 act
- 1878: La Première saisie, comedy in 1 act, with Hippolyte Bedeau
- 1880: Les Trucs de Truck, vaudeville in 1 act
