= Pierre-François Beauvallet =

French actor and playwright (1801–1873)

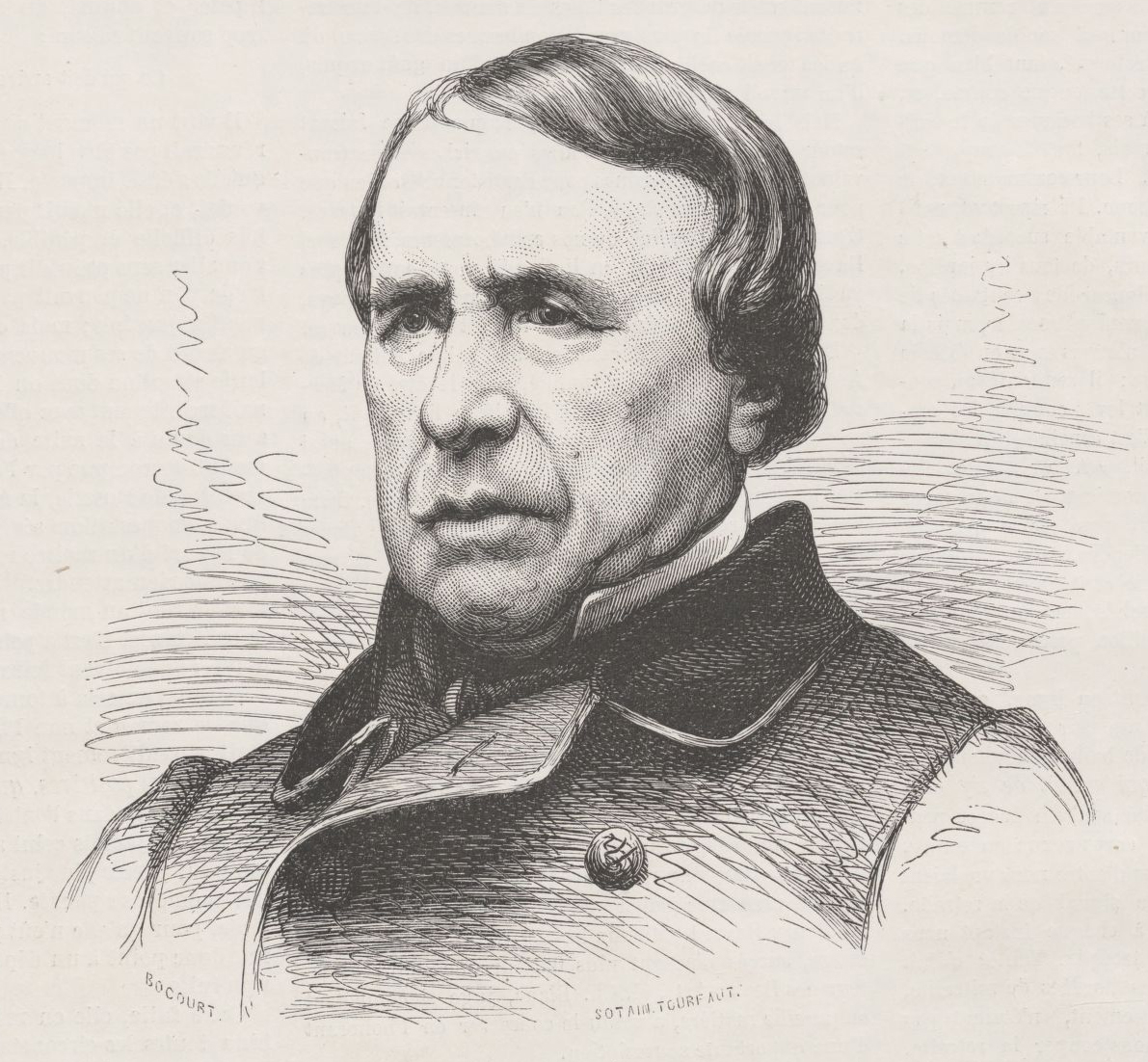
- Born: 13 October 1801; Pithiviers
- Died: 21 December 1873 (aged 72)
- Occupations: Stage actor, playwright

Pierre-François Beauvallet (13 October 1801 – 21 December 1873) was a 19th-century French actor and playwright.

== Biography ==
Beauvallet first made his reputation as a melodrama actor, then became an ordinary tragedian of the Comédie-Française; He tried with less success to be a playwright. His son was the writer and dramatist Léon Beauvallet.

He was a professor at the Conservatoire de Paris from 1839 to 1872.

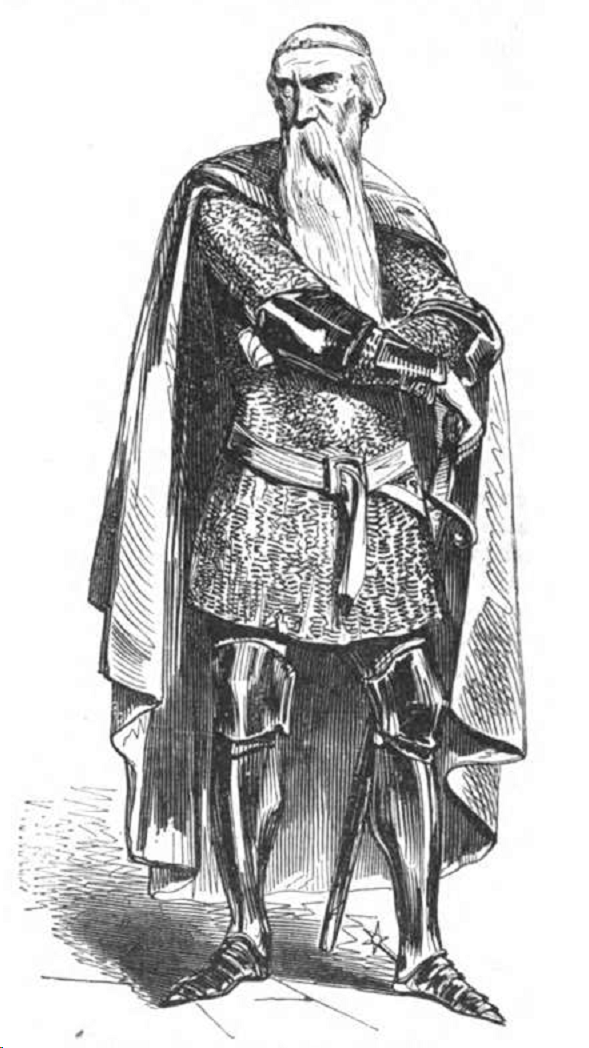
Beauvallet in Les Burgraves (Hiob's role) in 1843.

== Theatre ==
=== Career at the Comédie-Française ===
Entrance in 1830
Appointed 251st sociétaire in 1832
Departure in 1861

== Bibliography ==
- Pierre Larousse, « Léon Beauvallet », Grand dictionnaire universel du XIXe siècle, tome 2, Paris, 1867, p. 452, at Gallica

=== External links ===
- Base documentaire La Grange sur le site de la Comédie-Française
