= Louis Ange Pitou =

French author and counterrevolutionary

- Born: April 1767; Valainville, France
- Died: 8 May 1846 (aged 79); Paris, France
- Occupation(s): Author, counterrevolutionary

Louis Ange Pitou (April 1767 in Valainville, a commune of Moléans 5 kilometres (3.1 mi) from Châteaudun – 8 May 1846 in Paris) was a French author and counterrevolutionary.

== Biography ==
He entered the priesthood, but after the beginning of the French Revolution he abandoned his profession. A zealous royalist, he was arrested sixteen times, and finally transported to Guiana under the Directory. Shortly after his arrival at Cayenne he escaped, and after many adventures among the natives he returned to France. He engaged in new conspiracies under the consulate, and was a few years in prison. After the return of the Bourbons, Pitou received a small pension.

== Works ==
He published Relation de mon voyage à Cayenne et chez les anthropophages ("Story of my journey to Cayenne and among the cannibals"; Paris, 1805). This work, although full of inaccuracies, excited the public curiosity, and a second, enlarged edition was published (2 vols., 1808).
