= Clairville (Louis-François Nicolaïe) =

French comedian, poet, chansonnier, goguettier and playwright

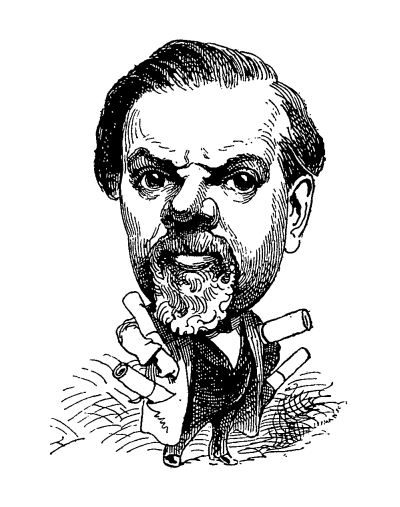
- Caricature of Clairville published in Le Trombinosocope of Touchatout, 1874
- Born: 28 January 1811; Lyon
- Died: 9 February 1879 (aged 68); Paris
- Occupations: Comedian; Poet; Chansonnier

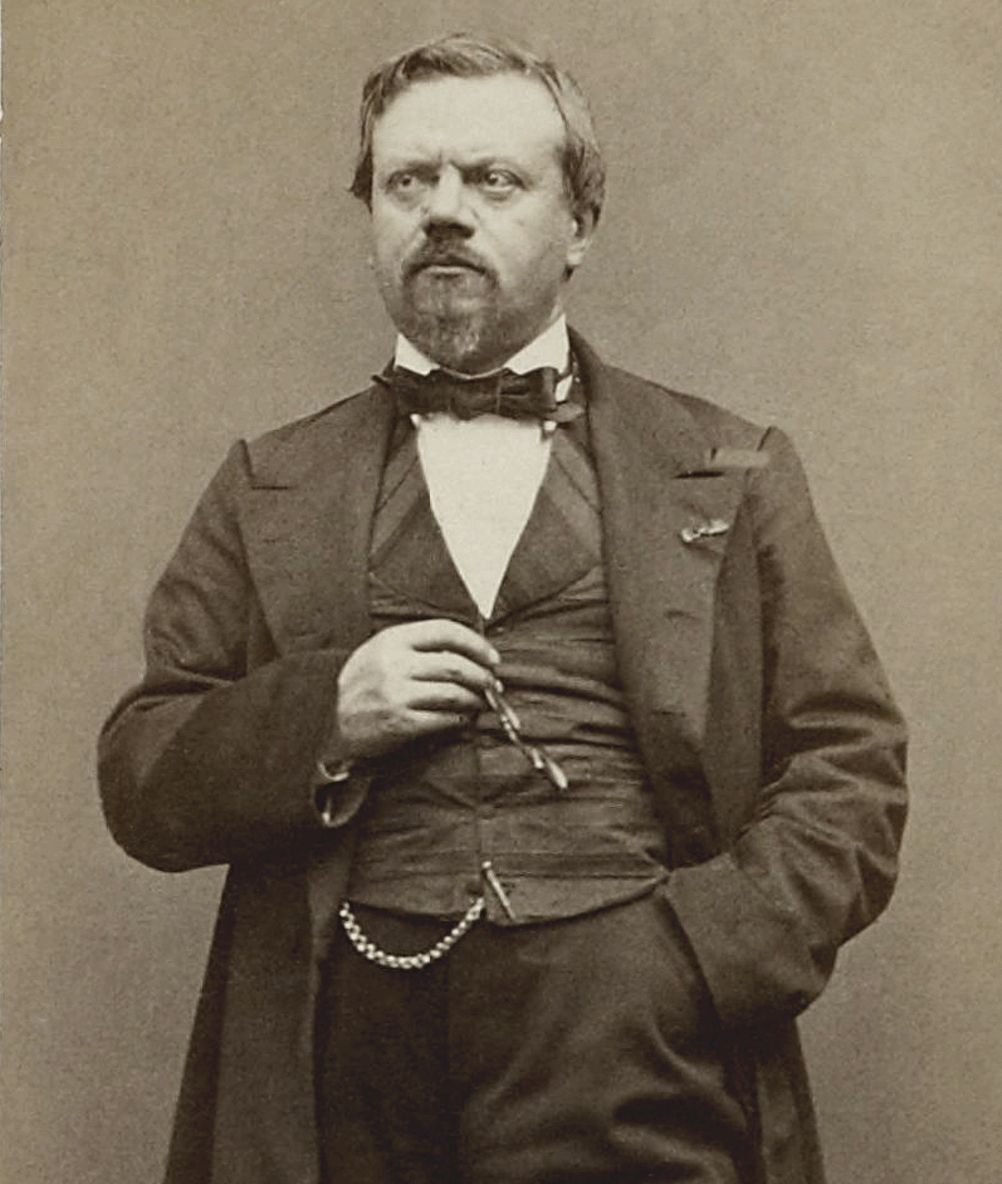
Clairville, par Étienne Carjat.

Louis-François-Marie Nicolaïe (28 January 1811 – 8 February 1879), better known as Clairville, was a 19th-century French comedian, poet, chansonnier, goguettier and playwright.

== Biography ==
Son of the Lyonese playwright and stage manager Alexandre-Henri Nicolaïe dit Clairville (died 1832), he began in 1821 in Paris at the Luxembourg Theater as actor with Madame Saqui, then as stage manager and finally, from 1837, exclusively as playwright. He later joined the Théâtre de l'Ambigu-Comique, playing small roles and developed his craft as a playwright, finding that to be his true vocation. He first conceived a revue titled 1836 dans la lune, the success of which would launch his career. His plays included comedies, serious plays, revues, féeries, satires and parodies. In 1846 a revue of his was produced at the Théâtre du Vaudeville: Les Dieux d'Olympe à Paris, in which the gods, bored with their existence on Mount Olympus, come to Paris intent on pleasure. Kracauer states that its "motif being the conquest of boredom by unbridled pleasure, it might almost be regarded as a precursor of Offenbach's great operettas".

He is credited with at least 230 miscellaneous pieces of which 50 have reached one hundred representations followed. He was particularly known for his comédies en vaudeville. He was assisted, from the beginning of his career, by his friend Edward Miot. His group of his collaborators grew to include Dumanoir, Dennery, Nicot and Cordier. They drew inspiration from the news of the day. Clairville collaborated with other authors, including the Cogniard brothers, Lambert-Thiboust, Paul Siraudin, Victor Koning, Henri Chivot and Alfred Duru, Édouard Plouvier, Alfred Delacour for plays and operettas.

Clairville was an active member of the fourth Société du Caveau, of which he was president in 1871.

"Clarville doesn't not compose, he makes ... kind of literary thrift store, where old threadbare words and buried puns are dressed to the nine," wrote Henri Rochefort; but he added, "not an administrative measure, not a weird ad, not a new invention that Mr. Clarville has not set in a script or turned into couplets. This is the man of the review and parody par excellence."

In 1853, he published Chansons et Poésies, a collection of rhymes, from the ribald songs, "which are sung in the desert" according to Albert Blanquet, to the touching simplicity of the poems. He was awarded the cross of Chevalier of the Légion d'honneur in 1857.

In 1870, he composed the song Les Deux Canailles, in response to the song La Canaille by Alexis Bouvier. In 1871, he wrote at least two anti-communard songs: L'Internationale where he gave his vision of the "Internationale ouvrière" as a collection of bandits, and La Commune in which he called for the massacre of Communards.

Clairville died of pneumonia on 8 February 1879. After the funeral at Église Saint-Eugène-Sainte-Cécile in Paris on 10 February, he was buried at Montmartre Cemetery.

== Family ==
Clairville had two sons. The composer Édouard-François Nicolaïe, known as Clairville fils (1854–1904) was from his marriage with Angélique Gabrielle Pagès. Charles-Albert Nicolaïe, known as "Clairvoyance" (1833–1892), an employee at the Comptoir d'Escompte de Paris, was born of an affair with Augustine Philippon. Claiville was the uncle of the playwright and librettist Charles-Victor Nicolaïe, known as Charles Clairville (1855-1927).

== Selected works ==
Clairville's plays written in collaboration with leading playwrights of his time or that continue to be presented, include the following:

- 1843: Les Hures-Graves with Dumanoir and Alfred Delacour
- 1845: Les Pommes de terre malades with Dumanoir
- 1845: Le Petit Poucet with Dumanoir
- 1846: Gentil-Bernard ou l'Art d'aimer with Dumanoir
- 1846: Colombe et Perdreau with Jules Cordier
- 1846: La Femme électrique with Jules Cordier
- 1847: Éther, Magnétisme et Hatchis with Jules Cordier
- 1847: Léonard le perruquier with Dumanoir
- 1848: La propriété, c'est le vol with Jules Cordier
- 1848: L'Avenir dans le passé ou les Succès au paradis with Jules Cordier
- 1848: Le Club des maris ou le Club des femmes with Jules Cordier
- 1848: Les Parades de nos pères with Dumanoir and Jules Cordier
- 1848: Les Lampions de la veille et les Lanternes du lendemain with Dumanoir
- 1849: Les Marraines de l'an III with Dumanoir
- 1849: Exposition des produits de la République with Eugène Labiche and Dumanoir
- 1850: Lully ou les Petits Violons de Mademoiselle with Dumanoir
- 1850: Le Bourgeois de Paris ou les Leçons au pouvoir with Dumanoir and Jules Cordier
- 1851: Le Duel au baiser with Éléonore Tenaille de Vaulabelle (alias Jules Cordier). One-act comedy mingled with couplets.
- 1852: Les Coulisses de la vie with Dumanoir
- 1852: La Femme aux œufs d'or with Dumanoir
- 1853: Les Folies dramatiques with Dumanoir
- 1858: Turlututu chapeau pointu with Édouard Martin and Albert Monnier, music by Léon Bovery
- 1860: La Fille du Diable with Paul Siraudin and Lambert-Thiboust
- 1860: Daphnis et Chloé with Jules Cordier, music by Jacques Offenbach
- 1863: Peau d'âne, féerie in 4 acts and 20 tableaux, with Louis-Émile Vanderburch and Laurencin, music by Léon Fossey, Théâtre de la Gaîté (14 August)
- 1864: La Revue pour rien ou Roland à Ronge-Veau, with Paul Siraudin and Ernest Blum, music by Hervé
- 1869: Le Mot de la fin with Paul Siraudin
- 1869: Paris-Revue with Paul Siraudin and William Busnach
- 1872: La revue n'est pas au coin du quai with Paul Siraudin and Victor Koning
- 1872: Héloïse et Abélard avec William Busnach, music by Henry Litolff
- 1872: La fille de Madame Angot with Paul Siraudin and Victor Koning, music by Charles Lecocq
- 1873: Les cent vierges music by Charles Lecocq
- 1874: La Belle au bois dormant, music by Henry Litolff
- 1877: Les cloches de Corneville with Charles Gabet, music by Robert Planquette
