= Aurélien Scholl =

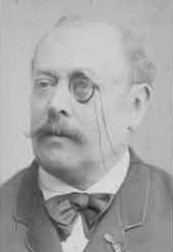
Aurélien Scholl.

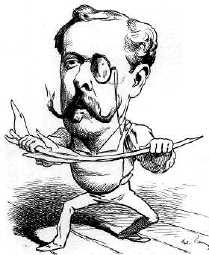
Caricature.

Aurélien Scholl (July 13, 1833 in Bordeaux – April 16, 1902), was a French author and journalist.

He was successively editor of Le Voltaire and of L'Écho de Paris. He wrote largely for the theatre, as well as a number of novels dealing with Parisian life. He was included in the painting Music in the Tuileries, by Manet, as one of the flâneurs of the day.

== Works ==
- Lettres à Mon Domestique (1854)
- L'Outrage (1867)
- Fleurs d'Adultère (1880)
- L'Orgie Parisienne (1883)
- La Farce Politique (1887)
- Les Ingénues de Paris (1893)
- Denise (1894)
- Tableaux Vivants (1896)
- Les petits papiers. Comédie en un acte (1897)
- L'esprit d'Aurelien Scholl (1925) edited by Léon Treich

== Honours and awards ==
- Chevalier of the Order of Legion of Honour (1878)
- Officier of the Order of Legion of Honour (1884)
