= Paul Siraudin =

French playwright and librettist

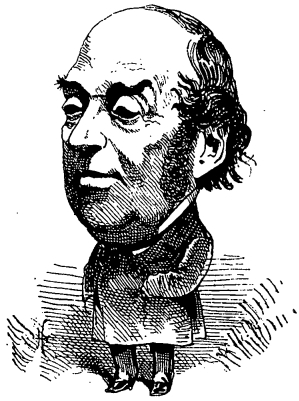
- Portrait of Paul Siraudin published in Le Trombinoscope by Touchatout in 1874.
- Born: Pierre-Paul-Désiré Siraudin; 18 December 1812; 1st arrondissement of Paris
- Died: 8 September 1883 (aged 70); Enghien-les-Bains
- Occupations: Librettist, playwright

Pierre-Paul-Désiré Siraudin (18 December 1812 – 8 September 1883) was a French playwright and librettist.

He also used the pen names Paul de Siraudin de Sancy, Paul Siraudin de Sancy and M. Malperché.

== Biography ==
He wrote many plays, mainly comedies and vaudevilles written in collaboration, notably with Alfred Delacour and Lambert-Thiboust. He also authored librettos for successful operettas and opéras-comiques, including La fille de Madame Angot (1872) in collaboration with Clairville and Victor Koning with music by Charles Lecocq.

In 1860, Siraudin opened a confectionery shop — the Maison Siraudin — at the corner of the Rue de la Paix and the Place Vendôme. Siraudin's sweets were "renowned all the world over"; for example, Siraudin's Perles des Pyrénées ("Pearls of the Pyrenees"), consisting of perfumed sugar, are mentioned in Joris-Karl Huysmans' novel À rebours (1884).

== Works ==
- 1842: La Vendetta with Dumanoir, Théâtre des Variétés
- 1849: E. H. with Eugène Moreau and Alfred Delacour, Théâtre Montansier (7 April)
- 1850: Le Courrier de Lyon by Eugène Moreau, Paul Siraudin and Alfred Delacour, Théâtre de la Gaîté
- 1852: Le Misanthrope et l'Auvergnat by Eugène Labiche, Paul Siraudin and Lubize, Théâtre du Palais-Royal
- 1853: Le Bourreau des crânes by Paul Siraudin and Édouard Lafargue, Théâtre du Palais-Royal
- 1855: Un bal d'auvergnats by Paul Siraudin, Alfred Delacour and Lambert-Thiboust, Théâtre du Palais-Royal
- 1856: La Queue de la poële by Paul Siraudin and Alfred Delacour, Théâtre du Palais-Royal
- 1858: Le Fils de la belle au bois dormant by Lambert-Thiboust, Paul Siraudin and Adolphe Choler, Théâtre du Palais-Royal
- 1860: La Pénélope normande by Alphonse Karr, Paul Siraudin and Lambert-Thiboust, Théâtre du Vaudeville
- 1860: La Pénélope à la mode de Caen by Eugène Grangé, Paul Siraudin and Lambert-Thiboust, Théâtre du Palais-Royal
- 1860: La Fille du diable by Clairville, Paul Siraudin and Lambert-Thiboust, Théâtre des Variétés
- 1860: Le Favori de la favorite by Paul Siraudin and Auguste Villemot, Théâtre de Baden-Baden
- 1864: Les Femmes sérieuses and Paul Siraudin, Alfred Delacour and Ernest Blum, Théâtre du Palais-Royal
- 1869: Le Mot de la fin by Clairville and Paul Siraudin, Théâtre des Variétés
- 1869: Paris-Revue by Clairville, Paul Siraudin and William Busnach, Théâtre du Chatelet
- 1872: La Revue n'est pas au coin du quai by Paul Siraudin, Victor Koning and Clairville, Théâtre des Variétés
- 1873: La fille de Madame Angot de Paul Siraudin, Clairville and Victor Koning, music by Charles Lecocq, Théâtre des Folies Dramatiques
- 1875: La Revue à la vapeur by Paul Siraudin, Henri Blondeau and Hector Monréal, Théâtre des Variétés
