= Théodore Barrière =

French playwright

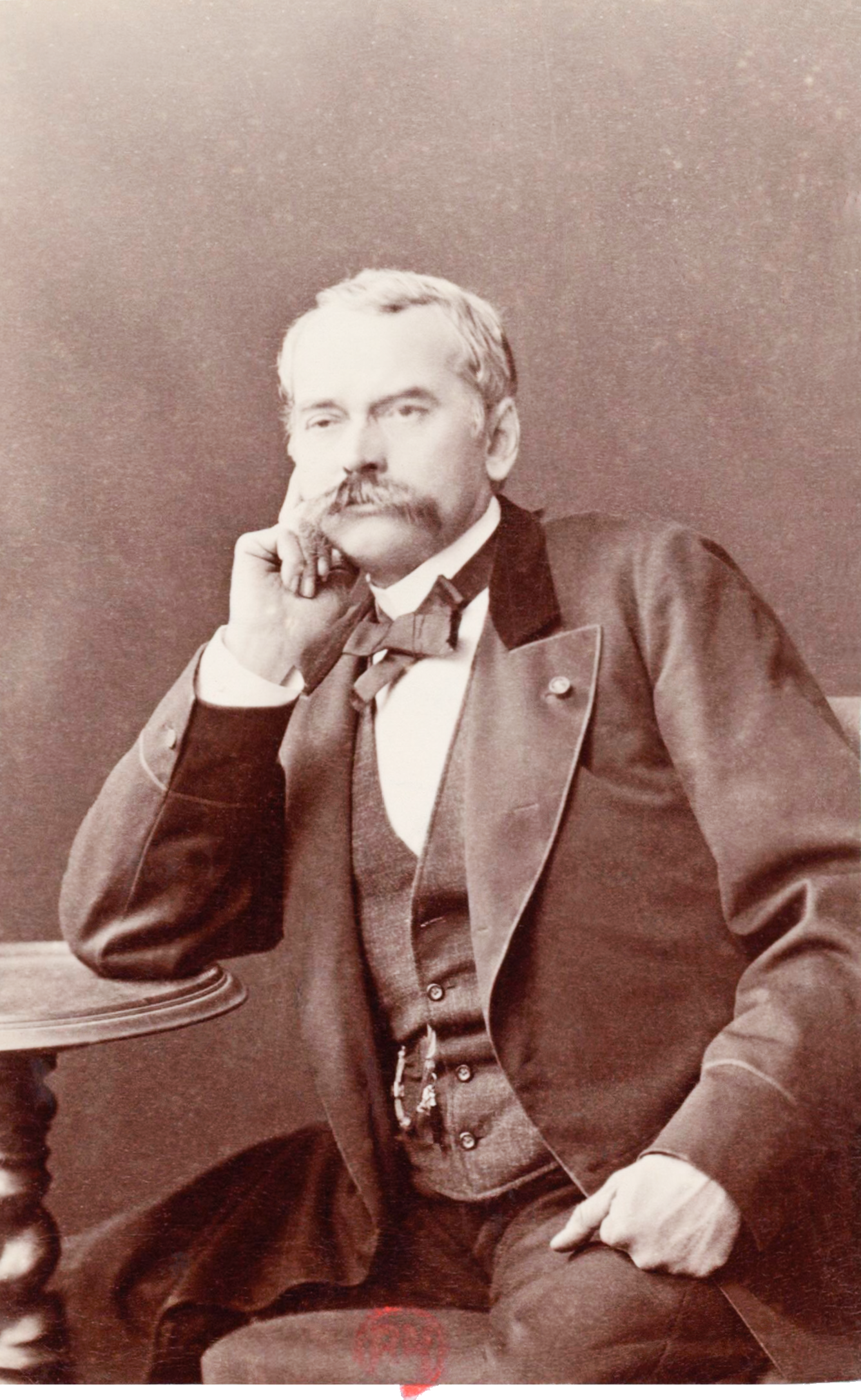
- Portrait photographique par Nadar en 1871.
- Born: Louis Théodore Barrière; 16 April 1821 former 11th arrondissement of Paris
- Died: 16 October 1877 rue Bergère
- Resting place: Père Lachaise Cemetery
- Occupations: Playwright, writer
- Awards: Officer of the Legion of Honor (1874); Chevalier of the Legion of Honour (1858)

Signature
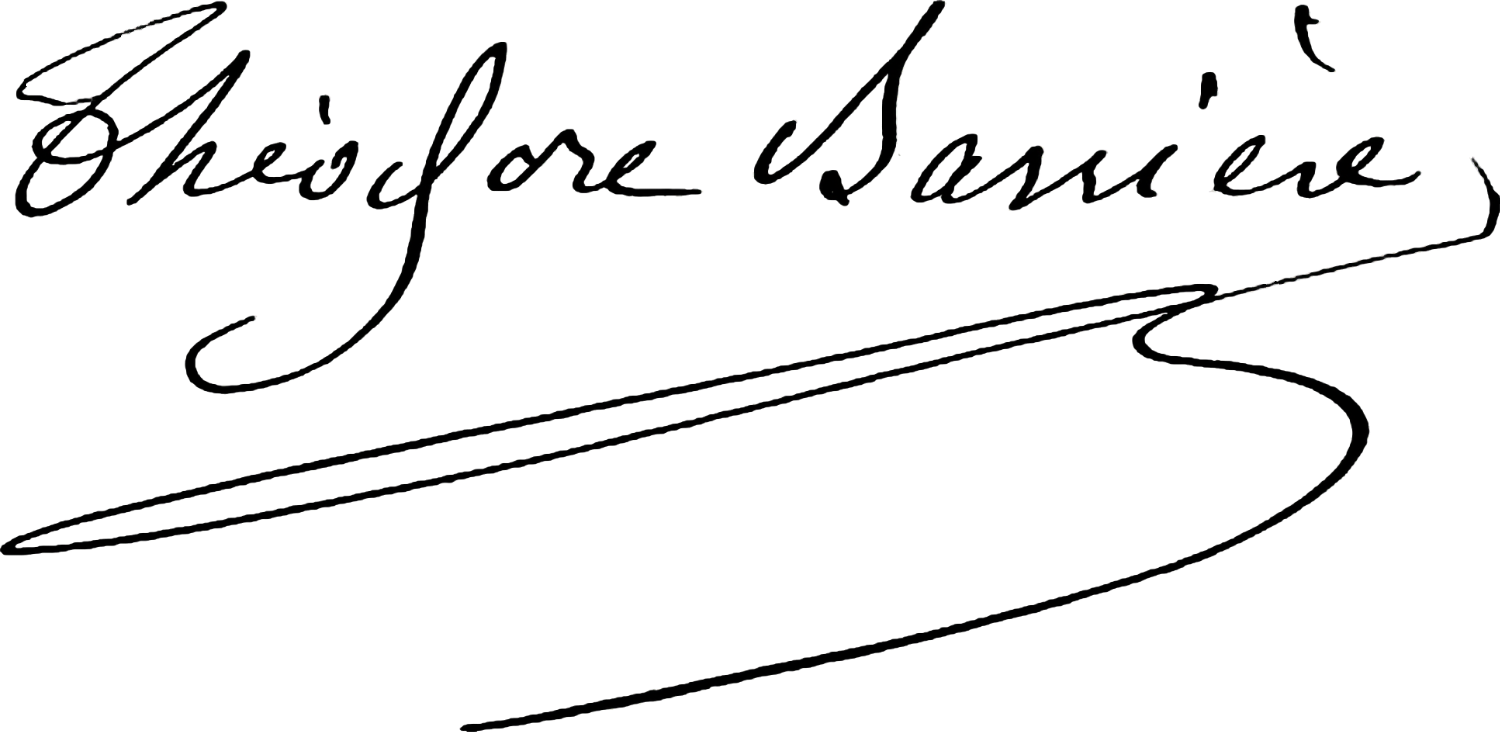

Théodore Barrière (1823 – 16 October 1877), French playwright, was born in Paris.

He belonged to a family of map engravers which had long been connected with the war department, and spent nine years in that service himself. The success of a vaudeville he had performed at the Beaumarchais and which was immediately snapped up for the repertory of the Palais Royal, showed him his real vocation. During the next thirty years he signed, alone or in collaboration, over a hundred plays; among the most successful were:

- La Vie de bohème (1849), adapted from Henri Murger’s book with the novelist's help
- Manon Lescaut (1851)
- Les Filles de marbre (1853) (subsequently adapted into English as The Marble Heart by Charles Selby)
- Les Faux Bonshommes (1856) with Ernest Capendu
- L’Héritage de Monsieur Plumet (1858)
- Les Gens nerveux (1860), with Victorien Sardou
- Malheureux vaincus (1865), which was forbidden by the censor
- Le Gascon (1873), with Louis Davyl, incidental music by Vizentini and Offenbach

Barrière died in Paris.
