= Joanny Augier =

French playwright and journalist

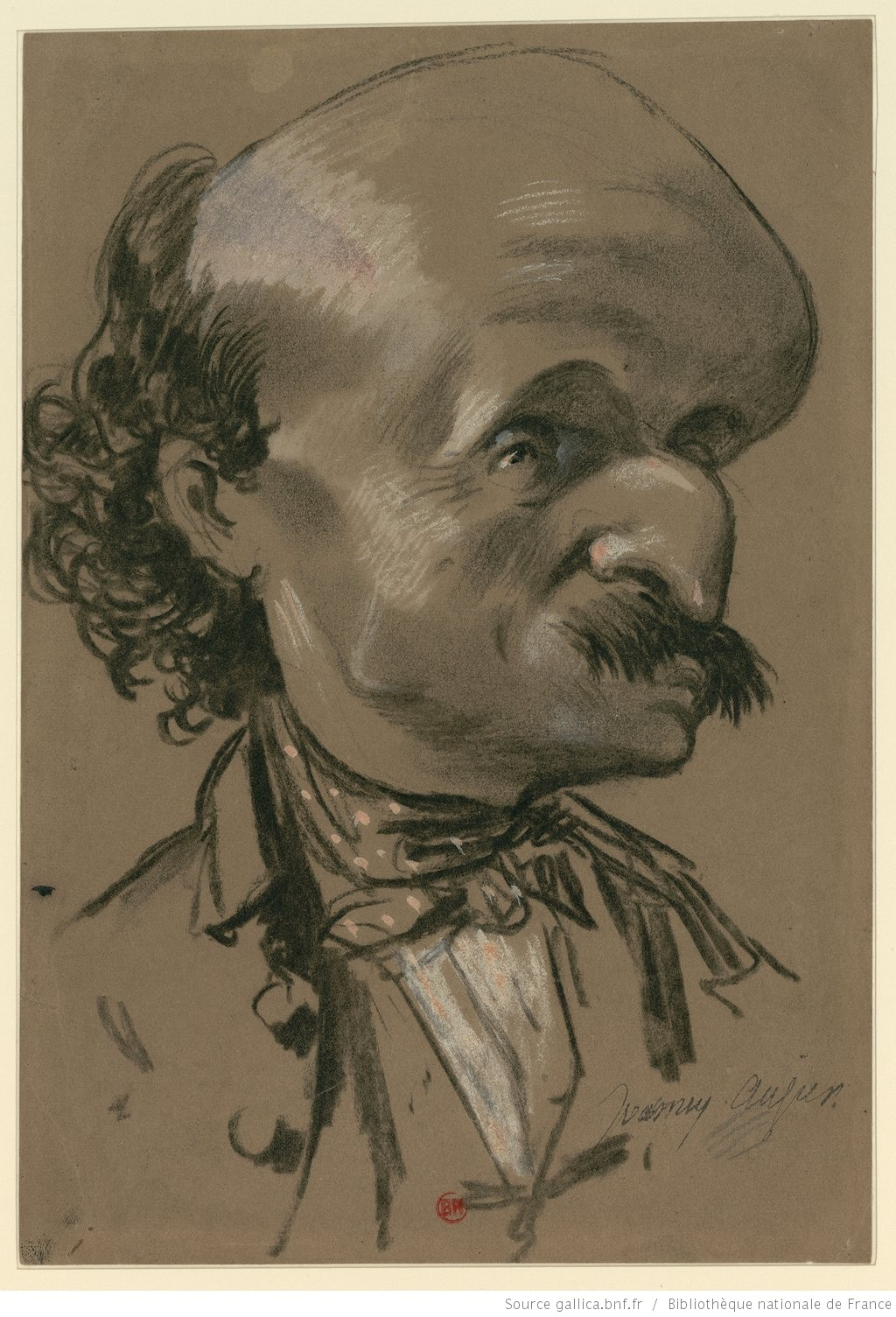
- Joanny Augier, caricature by Nadar
- Born: Jean-Baptiste Augier; 3 April 1813; Lyon
- Died: 17 February 1855 (aged 41); Lyon
- Occupation: Plawright

Jean-Baptiste Augier called Joanny Augier, (3 April 1813 – 17 February 1855.) was a 19th-century French playwright and journalist.

== Biography ==
A secretary of Lamartine after the French Revolution of 1848 (24 February), an éditor at the Le Pays, his plays were presented, among others, at the Théâtre de la Gaîté and the Théâtre du Gymnase.

Suddenly confined to the Centre hospitalier Saint-Jean-de-Dieu in Lyon following a fit of madness, he died shortly after on 17 February 1855.

== Works ==
We owe him forty-eight plays shown on Paris and Lyon stages between 1835 and 1852 including:

- 1835: Le Trésor de Bagnolet, comédie en vaudeville in one act, with Charles Labie, at the Théâtre du Panthéon (5 December)
- 1836: Jeune fille et Roi, comédie en vaudeville in one act mingled with singing after a short story by Mme Desbordes-Valmore, with Labie, at the Théâtre du Panthéon (20 February)
- 1837: Le Cauchemar, revue lyonnaise de 1836, vaudeville épisodique in one act with Labie, at the théâtre du Gymnase de Lyon (6 January)
- 1837: Julie et Saint-Preux, ou La Nouvelle Héloï͏se, drama in three acts, with Charles Desnoyer and Charles Labie, at the Théâtre de la Gaîté (14 January)
- 1837: Micaëla ou la Folle de Marie de Bourgogne, drama in three acts mingled with singing after a short story by Alphonse Royer, with Labie, music byAntoine Maniquet, at the Théâtre du Gymnase de Lyon (28 February)
- 1837: Les Giboulées de mars, comédie en vaudeville in one act, with Labie, at the Théâtre des Célestins (31 March)
- 1838: Charlotte, ou la Belle aux écus, comédie en vaudeville in one act, with Labie and Desnoyer, at the Théâtre de la Gaîté (27 May)
- 1839: Le Mauvais sujet, comédei en vaudeville in one acte, with Labie and Adolphe Salvat, at the Théâtre de l'Ambigu-Comique (7 July)
- 1839: Les Femmes laides de Paris, comédie rn vaudeville in one act, with Labie, at the Théâtre des Folies-Dramatiques (29 August)
- 1839: La Maupin, ou Une vengeance d'artiste, comédie en vaudeville in one act, with Labie, at the Théâtre de la Gaîté (8 December)
- 1840: L'Ile de Calypso, folie-vaudeville in one act, with Salvat, at the Théâtre de la Porte-Saint-Antoine (30 May)
- 1841 Le Canut, portrait extrait du volume 6 des Français peints par eux-mêmes : Encyclopédie morale du dix-neuvième siècle, introduction by Jules Janin, Paris, Louis Curmer publisher
- 1841: La Pension bourgeoise, comédie en vaudeville in five acts, with Achille Guenée, at the Théâtre Saint-Antoine (July)
- 1841: Les Tirailleurs de Vincennes, drame-vaudeville in two acts with Salvat, at the théâtre de la Porte-Saint-Antoine (18 September)
- 1842: Duchesse et Poissarde, comédie en vaudeville in two acts, with Salvat, at the Théâtre des Folies-Dramatiques (27 March)
- 1842: L'Opium et le vin de Champagne, ou la Guerre de Chine, comédie en vaudeville in one act, with Clairville and Salvat, at the Théâtre des Variétés (May)
- 1843: Adrienne, ou Le diable au corps, comedy in one act mingled with couplets, at the Théâtre de la Gaîté (8 July)
- 1845: Les Laveuses de Provence, comédie en vaudeville in one act, with Labie, at the Théâtre du Luxembourg (10 June)
- 1849: Départ pour l'Icarie, ou Lyon en 1848, revue-vaudeville in one act, at the Théâtre des Célestins (3 January)
- 1852: Le Moutardier du roi du Maroc, comédie en vaudeville in two acts, with Raymond Deslandes, at the Théâtre des Folies-Dramatiques (20 March)

== Bibliography ==
- 1855: Joseph-Marie Quérard, Le Quérard: archives d'histoire littéraire, vol.1, 1855, (p. 471–472)
- 1856: Jules Janin, Almanach de la littérature et des beaux-arts, (p. 77) (annonce de décès)
- 1867: J. Goizet, A. Burtal, Dictionnaire universel du Théâtre en France et du théâtre français à l'étranger, (p. 110–111)
