= Hippolyte Rimbaut =

Hippolyte Louis Rimbaut (1818–1888) was a 19th-century French playwright.

A collaborator with Le Temps, his plays were presented on the most important Parisian stages of the first half of the 19th century, including the Théâtre du Panthéon, the Théâtre de l'Ambigu, and the Théâtre des Délassements-Comiques.

Contrary to what some sources can write, it was not a pseudonym for Fulgence de Bury.

== Works ==
- Diane de Poitiers, ou Deux fous et un roi, drama in 3 acts, with Charles Desnoyer, 1833
- Le Fils de Ninon, drama in 3 acts, mingled with songs, with Jacques-François Ancelot and E. F. Varez, 1834
- Angélina, drama in 3 acts, mingled with songs, 1835
- Vaugelas, ou le Ménage d'un savant, comédie en vaudeville in 1 act, with Desnoyer, 1836
- L'Honneur de ma mère, drama in 3 acts, with Auguste-Louis-Désiré Boulé, 1837
- Guillaume Norwood, ou Une haine de vieillards, drama in 3 acts, with Hippolyte-Jules Demolière, 1838
- Corneille et Richelieu, comédie en vaudeville in 1 act, with Boulé, 1839
- Le Marquis de Brancas, comedy in 3 acts, mingled with songs, after a short story by Alexandre de Lavergne, with Demolière and Laurençot, 1839
- Le Sauf conduit, comédie en vaudeville in 2 acts, 1839
- L'amie et l'amant, ou La confiance du mari, comédie en vaudeville in 1 act, with Charles Potier, 1840
- Les Diners à trente deux sous, vaudeville in 1 act, with the Cogniard brothers, 1840
- Denise, ou l'Avis du ciel, drama in 5 acts, with Boulé, 1840
- Émery le négociant, drama in 3 acts, with Boulé, 1842
- La Fille du diable, vaudeville fantastique in 1 act, with Salvat, 1847
- Marceline la vachère, drame-vaudeville in 3 acts, with Laurençot, 1847
- Peu s'en fallait, esquisse de mœurs in 3 tableaux and in verses, 1847
- Un coup de pinceau, comédie en vaudeville in 1 act, with Charles Henri Ladislas Laurençot, 1848
- Entre amis, vaudeville in 1 act, with Laurençot, 1848
- Le Ver luisant, ou la Métempsycose, féérie in 5 acts and 12 parts, with Édouard Brisebarre, 1850
- Un doigt de vin, comédie en vaudeville en 1 act, with Achille Bourdois, 1852
- Les Postillons de Crèvecoeur, scènes de la vie de campagne, in 1 act, with Brisebarre, 1853
- Trois pour un secret, scène de la vie de famille, with Brisebarre, 1855
- Le Jour du frotteur, scène de la vie de ménage, with Brisebarre, 1856
- Le Professeur des cuisinières, scènes de la vie de ménage, with Brisebarre, 1856
- La Chasse au sorcier, comedy in 3 acts, 1859
- Le Dompteur de femmes, vaudeville in 1 act, with Deslandes, 1859
- Taureau le brasseur, vaudeville in 1 act, with Adolphe Salvat, 1859
- L'Avocat des dames, comédie en vaudeville in 1 act, with Raymond Deslandes, 1864
- Le Cadeau d'un horloger, vaudeville in 1 act, 1866
- Les Chambres de bonnes, vaudeville in 3 acts, with Deslandes, 1868
- Une fausse joie, comedy in 1 act, with Deslandes, 1869
- Le Commandant Frochard, comedy in 3 acts, with Deslandes, 1873
- Les Échéances d'Angèle, comedy in 1 act, with Alfred Delacour, 1878

== Bibliography ==
- Joseph Marie Quérard, La littérature française contemporaine: 1827-1849, 1857, (p. 190)
- Michel Autrand, Le théâtre en France de 1870 à 1914, 2006, (p. 266) et (p. 648)
