= Adolphe Salvat =

French playwright (died 1876)

Jean Frédéric Adolphe Salvat, died in Paris in 1876, was a 19th-century French playwright.

His plays were presented on the most important Parisian stages of his time, including the Théâtre des Variétés, Théâtre de la Porte-Saint-Antoine, the Théâtre du Vaudeville, and the Théâtre des Folies-Dramatiques.

== Works ==
- 1837: Le Chemin de fer de Saint-Germain, one-act à-propos-vaudeville, with Jean Pierre Charles Perrot de Renneville and Henri de Tully
- 1838: Les Femmes libres, three-act folie-vaudeville and extravaganza, with Pierre Tournemine
- 1839: Le Mauvais sujet, one-act comédie en vaudevilles, with Charles Labie and Joanny Augier
- 1840: L'Île de Calypso, one-act folie-vaudeville, with Joanny Augier
- 1842: Duchesse et poissarde, two-act comédie en vaudevilles, with Joanny Augier
- 1843: La Jeune et la vieille garde, épisode de 1814, in 1 act, with Clairville, 1843
- 1845: Les Deux tambours, one-act comédie en vaudevilles, with Lubize and Edmond-Frédéric Prieur
- 1847: La Fille du diable, one-act vaudeville fantastique, with Hippolyte Rimbaut
- 1850: La Grenouille du régiment, one-act comédie en vaudevilles, with Lubize
- 1853: La Petite Provence, one-act comédie en vaudevilles, with Édouard Brisebarre
- 1858: L'Agent matrimonial, one-act comédie en vaudevilles, with Perrot de Renneville
- 1859: Taureau le brasseur, one-act comédie en vaudevilles, with Rimbaut
- undated: Le Revers de la médaille, two-act comédie en vaudevilles

== Bibliography ==
- Joseph-Marie Quérard, Charles Louandre, La littérature française contemporaine: XIXe siècle, 1857, p. 304 (read online)
