= Lubize =

French playwright and librettist (1798–1863)

- Born: Pierre-Michel Martin; 21 February 1798; Bayonne, France
- Died: 28 January 1863 (aged 64); 9th arrondissement of Paris, France
- Occupations: Playwright, librettist
- Spouse: Virginie Guyot

Lubize, real name Pierre-Michel Martin or Martin-Lubize (21 February 1798 (3 ventôse an VI) – 28 January 1863) was a 19th-century French playwright and librettist.

Also known under the pseudonym Morel, he authored more than one hundred vaudevilles, alone or in collaboration.

== Biography ==
The son of Michel Martin, former soldier, and of Marie Lubize whose name he chose as pseudonym, he studied at collège Bourbon and worked first in the office of the Laffitte et Cie bank.

On 21 June 1828, he married Virginie Guyot. and made his debut at theatre in 1832 with a three-act play titled L'Abbaye-aux-Bois, written in collaboration with Pixérécourt.

In May 1844, Lubize became director of the Théâtre du Vaudeville where he succeeded the playwright Jacques-François Ancelot.

At the announcement of his death, the magazine Jean Diable read:

M. Pierre Henri [sic] Martin called Lubize has just died at the age of 61. This playwright, born in Bayonne, held a very important place among the producers of our time. Alternately collaborator of MM. Léonce, Théaulon, Cogniard brothers, Grangé, Guinot, Labiche, Siraudin, Brisebarre, Paul de Kock, Varin, Michel Delaporte, etc., etc., he mingled his name to theirs in the signing of a large number of comedies, many of which were a great success, including the Conseil de discipline, Une assemblée de créanciers, le Muet de Saint-Malo, la Tasse cassée, le Misanthrope et l'Auvergnat, Obliger est si doux, le Spectacle à la Cour.

Mr. Lubize without collaborators has not been less successful: the Cinquantaine and Latude would suffice to prove it.

Among the people of theatre, one noticed at his funeral, MM. Hyppolyte Cogniard, Siraudin, Raymond Deslandes, Monval, Delacour and Michel Delaporte.

Labize was the uncle of dramatist Henry Becque (1837-1899).

== Works ==
- 1832: L'Abbaye-aux-Bois, ou la Femme de chambre, histoire contemporaine in three acts and six tableaux by René-Charles de Pixérécourt and Henri Martin, Théâtre de la Gaîté (14 February)
- 1832: Tout pour ma fille, drame-vaudeville in three acts with E. F. Varez and Léonce Laurençot, Théâtre de la Gaîté (24 July)
- 1832: M. Lombard, ou le Voyage d'agrément, folie-vaudeville in one act with Charles Varin and Desvergers, Théâtre de la Porte-Saint-Martin (15 août)
- 1834: La Cinquantaine, comédie-vaudeville on one act, Théâtre du Gymnase (19 July)
- 1835: Au clair de la lune, ou les Amours du soir, vaudeville in three acts with Varin et Desvergers, Théâtre des Variétés (11 February)
- 1835: La Suicidomanie, vaudeville in one act with Pierre Clozel, Théâtre du Cirque-Olympique (25 June)
- 1835: Une heure dans l'autre monde, folie-parade mingled with couplets with Eugène Ronteix, Théâtre du Panthéon (28 September)
- 1836: Ma sœur et ma place, comédie-vaudeville in one act with Hestienne, Théâtre des Variétés (27 March)
- 1836: Arriver à propos, comédie-vaudeville in one act with Étienne Arago, Théâtre du Vaudeville (7 September)
- 1836: Le Conseil de discipline, vaudeville in one act with the Cogniard brothers, Théâtre du Palais-Royal (10 September)
- 1836: Fils aîné de veuve, drame-vaudeville en un acte de Lubize et Maillard, théâtre des Folies-Dramatiques (21 octobre)
- 1837: Le Muet de Saint-Malo, ou les Grandes émotions, vaudeville en un acte de Lubize et Varin, théâtre du Vaudeville (6 février)
- 1837: La Barbe de Jupiter, vaudeville in one act with Jules-Auguste Rauzet, Théâtre des Folies-Dramatiques (13 May)
- 1837: Spectacle à la Cour, vaudeville in two acts with Emmanuel Théaulon and Gustave Albitte, Théâtre du Gymnase (25 November)
- 1838: La Bonne Vieille, comédie-vaudeville in one act, Théâtre des Folies-Dramatiques (25 January)
- 1838: La Bourse de Pézénas, grrrrande [sic] spéculation industrielle mingled with vaudevilles with Léonce, Théâtre du Gymnase-dramatique (15 May)
- 1838: La Cachucha, ou Trois cœurs tout neufs, vaudeville in one act with Morel, Théâtre du Gymnase (30 July)
- 1839: La Baronne de Pinchina, vaudeville in two acts with Édouard Brisebarre, Théâtre des Folies-Dramatiques (7 February)
- 1840: Les Roueries du marquis de Lansac, comédie-vaudeville in three acts with Brisebarre, Théâtre de la Gaîté (16 February)
- 1840: La Mère Godichon, vaudeville in three acts with Michel Delaporte, Théâtre des Folies-Dramatiques (19 March)
- 1840: Les Dîners à trente-deux sous, vaudeville in one act with the frères Cogniard and Hippolyte Rimbaut, Théâtre du Palais-Royal (16 May)
- 1840: Une Assemblée de créanciers, tableau-vaudeville in one act with Théaulon, Théâtre du Gymnase-Dramatique (2 June)
- 1840: Les Mystères d'Udolphe, vaudeville fantastique in two acts with ***, Théâtre des Folies-dramatiques (3 June)
- 1841: M. Gribouillet, vaudeville in one act with Paul de Kock, Théâtre de la Porte-Saint-Martin (7 May)
- 1841: La Pommade du lion, vaudeville in one act with Fortuné, Théâtre des Folies-Dramatiques (20 June)
- 1841: Les Pages et les Brodeuses, vaudeville in two acte with Charles Davesne, Théâtre des Folies-Dramatiques (18 July)
- 1841: Les Jolies Filles de Stilberg, ou les Pages de l'Empereur, vaudeville in one act, Théâtre du Gymnase (30 December)
- 1842: Claudine, drama in three acts with Charles Desnoyer after the short story by Florian, Théâtre de la Porte-Saint-Martin (30 August)
- 1843: Un mauvais père, with Lajariette, Théâtre de la Gaîté (12 April)
- 1844: Les Trois Péchés du Diable, vaudeville in one act with Charles Varin, Théâtre du Gymnase (14 September)
- 1844: Les Petites Bonnes de Paris, vaudeville in three acts with Hippolyte Le Roux, Théâtre du Palais-Royal (30 December)
- 1845: La Coqueluche du quartier, vaudeville in one act, Théâtre de la Gaîté (3 February)
- 1845: Chacun chez soi, comédie-vaudeville in one act with Léonce Laurençot, Théâtre du Gymnane-Dramatique (15 June)
- 1845: L'Homme et la Mode, comédie-vaudeville in two acts with Lajariette, théâtre du Vaudeville (22 July)
- 1846: Les Trois Amoureux de Mariette, comédie-vaudeville in three acts with Brisebarre, Théâtre des Folies-Dramatiques (19 February)
- 1847: La Bouquetière du marché des Innocents, vaudeville in three acts with Charles Dallard, Théâtre des Délassements-Comiques (3 April)
- 1849: La Tasse cassée, comédie-vaudeville in one act with Paul Vermond, Théâtre du Gymnase-Dramatique (8 February)
- 1849: Une femme qui a une jambe de bois, comedy in one act mingled with couplets, with Hermant, Théâtre de la Montansier (16 July)
- 1852: Le Misanthrope et l'Auvergnat, comedy in one act mingled with couplets with Eugène Labiche and Paul Siraudin, Théâtre du Palais-Royal (10 August)
- 1854: Si ma femme le savait !, vaudeville in two acts with Chiarini-Lange, Théâtre des Variétés (8 August)
- 1855: La Bride sur le cou, vaudeville in one act, théâtre du Vaudeville (30 September)
- 1856: La Bourse au village, vaudeville in one act with Clairville and Siraudin, Théâtre des Variétés (2 July)
- 1856: Obliger est si doux !, comedy in ine act mingled with couplets, with Laurencin and Pierre Chapelle, Théâtre du Palais-Royal (29 November)
- 1857: Le Secret de ma femme, vaudeville in one act with Hermant, Théâtre du Vaudeville (27 July)

== Texts ==
- 1834 : Le Commis et la Grande Dame, Bibliothèque des romans nouveaux, Paris
