= Le Tintamarre =

French satirical newspaper (1843-1899)

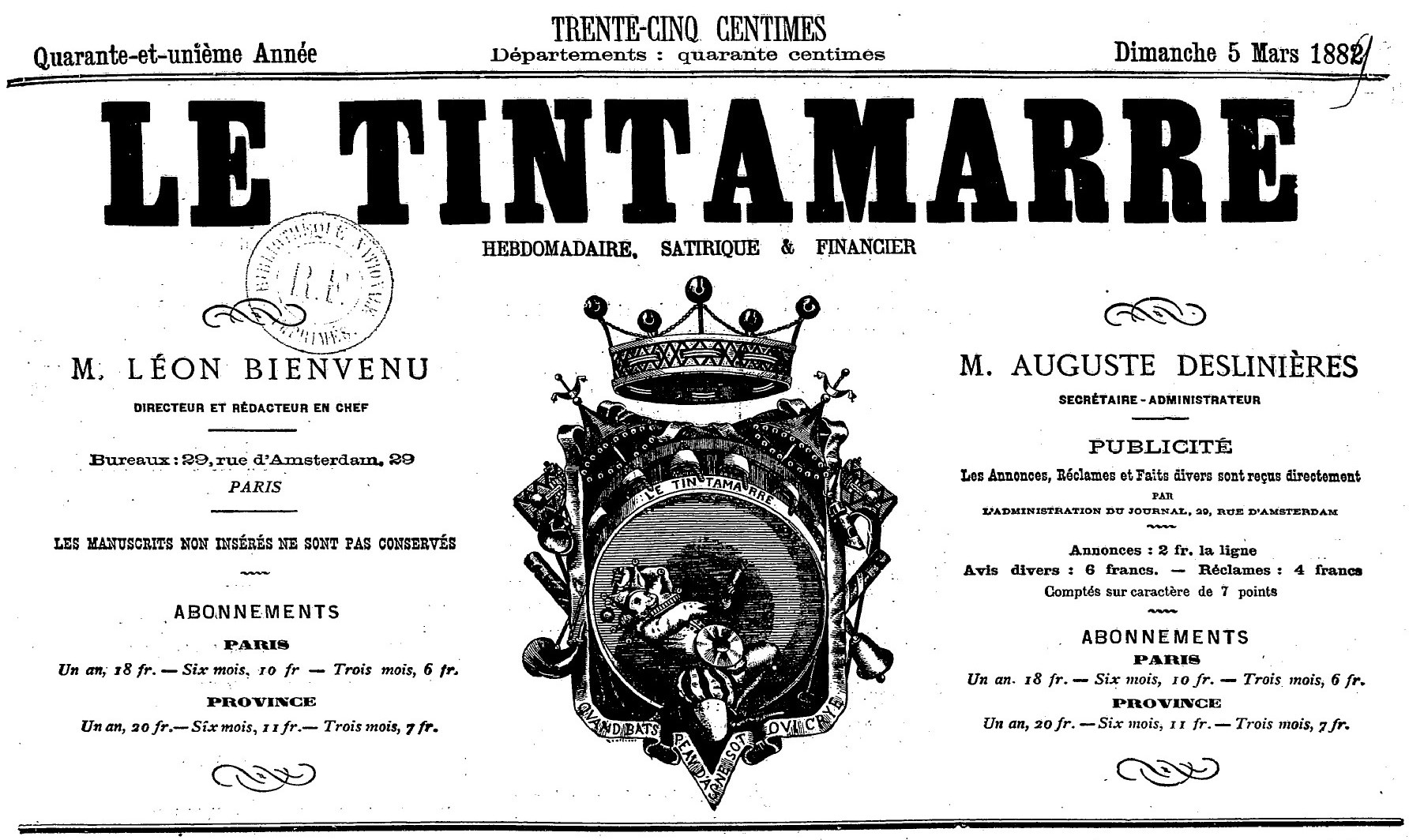
- Masthead of Le Tintamarre from March 5, 1882. The coat of arms was designed by Georges Lafosse in April 1876.
- Type: Satirical weekly
- Founder(s): Jules Lovy; Auguste Commerson
- Editor: Auguste Commerson (1843–1872); Léon Bienvenu (Touchatout) (1872–1899)
- Founded: March 19, 1843
- Ceased publication: December 31, 1899
- Language: French
- City: Paris
- Country: France
- ISSN: 2427-6421

Le Tintamarre was a French satirical weekly newspaper published from 1843 to 1899.

== History ==
Following a debut issue on March 19, 1843, Le Tintamarre was officially launched on April 2 of that year by Jules Lovy and Auguste Commerson, serving as editor-in-chief and director, respectively.

The title, a colloquial French term for "noise" or "racket," was chosen for its similarity to Commerson's earlier publication, Le Tam-Tam. Its subtitle, "critique de la réclame, satire des puffistes" ("criticism of advertising, satire of puffery"), reflected the paper's humorous and irreverent tone. Its pages featured witty, whimsical commentary on contemporary literary, artistic, and industrial developments alongside advertisements.

Most articles were penned under pseudonyms, with Lovy and Commerson sharing the heteronym "Joseph Citrouillard," among others. By 1850, the paper's circulation reached 2,300 copies.

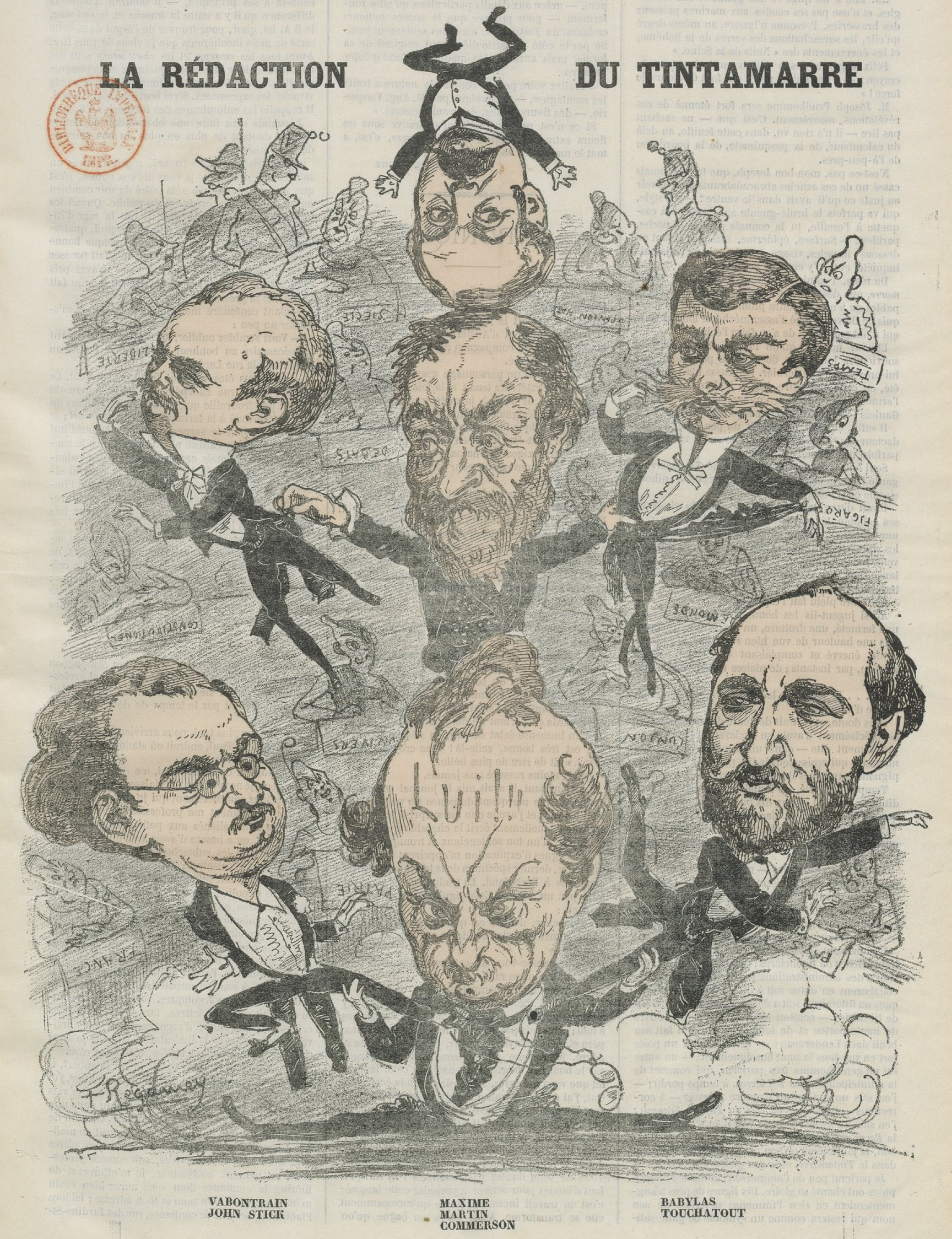
Caricature of the main editors of Le Tintamarre by Félix Régamey (1868).

In 1868, Léon Bienvenu, known as Touchatout, became co-owner alongside Commerson. By March 1872, he assumed full ownership and took on the roles of director and editor-in-chief. After parting ways with Le Tintamarre, Commerson revived Le Tam-Tam, which continued until 1918.

During the 1890s, publication became irregular, ceasing entirely on December 31, 1899, after 59 years and 2,672 issues. Though it rarely featured humorous illustrations, historian Bertrand Joly considers Le Tintamarre "the most direct ancestor of Le Canard enchaîné".

== Notable contributors ==
- Théodore de Banville (Francis Lambert)
- Amable Bapaume (Henri Normand)
- Alfred Barbou (Brévannes)
- Charles Baudelaire (Marc-Aurèle)
- Léon Bienvenu (Touchatout)
- Gaston Bing (Bengali)
- Hippolyte Briollet
- Amand Chemin (Armand Menich)
- E. Chomet (Grandgousier)
- Auguste Commerson
- Alfred Delilia
- Auguste Deslinières (Beausapin)
- Charles Desmarets (Chapelou)
- Raoul Fauvel
- Jules Jouy (Note: His first article, "Mauvaise foi" ("Bad Faith"), attacking an enemy of Victor Hugo, appeared in Le Tintamarre on April 23, 1876, p. 3 — available on Retronews.)
- Alphonse Lafitte
- Pierre-Charles Lamarle (Paul Faulquemont)
- Charles-Théodore Leroy
- Jules Lovy (Eugène Desmares, Théodore Langlois, Léonidas Prudhomme, Jérôme Soldièze)
- Georges Maillard
- Edmond Martin
- Maurice Millot (Orphée)
- Alfred Paulon (Cabrion)
- Léon Pujol (Tantinet, Léon Laforêt)
- G. Rémi (Gargantua)
- Jules Rohaut, known as Jules Dementhe (John Stick, Jean Lhuillier)
- Léon Rossignol
- Auguste Roussel, de Méry
- Edmond Thion
- Salvador Tuffet (Georges Procope)
- Eugène Vachette (Eugène Chavette)
- Auguste Vitu (Joseph d'Estienne)
- Guillaume Walther, known as Jehan Valter (Docteur Vabontrain)

== See also ==
- Le Canard enchaîné
- Charles Baudelaire
- Théodore de Banville
- Second French Empire

== Bibliography ==
- Mermet, Émile (1880). Annuaire de la presse française [Yearbook of the French Press] (in French). Paris. pp. 326–328.
- Rossignol, Léon (1865). Nos petits journalistes [Our Little Journalists] (in French). Paris: Gosselin. pp. 141–151.
