= List of compositions by Jacques Offenbach =

Offenbach in the 1860s

This is a list of compositions by Jacques Offenbach (1819–80). Offenbach is principally known for his operettas, of which he composed 98 between 1847 and 1880. He also wrote two opéras, Die Rheinnixen and his unfinished masterpiece Les contes d'Hoffmann.

In his early career he was an internationally celebrated cello virtuoso, and he also wrote a series of vocal and instrumental pieces.

== Operas ==
- Die Rheinnixen (Les fées du Rhin) (1864) — romantic opera in 4 acts (libretto: Nuitter, translated into German by Alfred von Walzogen). Performed at the Hofoper in Vienna on 4 February 1864.
- The Tales of Hoffmann (1881) — opera, libretto by Jules Barbier, unfinished, first performed, without the 'Giulietta' act, at the Opéra-Comique on 10 February 1881.

== Ballet ==
- Le papillon (1860) — ballet-fantastique in 2 acts (libretto: Jules-Henri Vernoy de Saint-Georges, choreography: Marie Taglioni). The only full length ballet composed by Offenbach; it was performed at the Paris Opera on 26 November 1860 and ran for 42 performances.

== Incidental music ==
- Un mariage sous la Régence (Guillard, 1850)
- Le joueur de flûte (Émile Augier, 1850)
- Valéria (Maquet and Jules Lacroix, 1851)
- Mademoiselle de la Seiglière (Sandeau, 1851)
- Le malade imaginaire (Molière, 1851/2)
- Le bonhomme jadis (Henri Murger, 1852)
- Le barbier de Séville ou La précaution inutile (Beaumarchais, 1852)
- La folle journée, ou Le mariage de Figaro (Beaumarchais, 1852)
- Murillo ou La corde du pendu (Aylic Langlé, 1853, also with music by Meyerbeer)
- Romulus (Dumas, Feuillet, Bocage, 1854)
- Le songe d'une nuit d'hiver (Plouvier, 1854)
- Le Brésilien, one-act 'comédie-vaudeville' by Meilhac and Halévy, songs by Offenbach, first performed at the Théâtre du Palais-Royal, 9 May 1863. The 'Ronde du Brésilien' became a popular number for café-concerts.
- Le Gascon, drame in five acts, nine tableaux, words by Théodore Barrière and Louis Davyl, music by Albert Vizentini and Offenbach, 2 September 1873
- La haine (Victorien Sardou, 1874; Offenbach produced this expensive production at the Théâtre de la Gaîté, which was a financial failure and contributed to his bankruptcy.)

== Vocal ==
Songs, from 1838 to 1873, including

- Six fables of La Fontaine (1842)
- Le langage des fleurs (1846)
- Les voix mystérieuses (1852)

== Cello ==
- Concerto in G Major for cello and orchestra, Concerto Militaire (1847-1848)
- Cello duets 'cours méthodique de duos', Opp. 49–54
- Deux âmes au ciel, Introduction and valse mélancolique, Rêverie au bord de la mer, La course en traîneau
- Harmonies des bois, Op. 76: Le soir, élégie; La chanson de Berthe; Les larmes de Jacqueline
- Les Chants du crépuscule (1846) (Éd. Chaball) – 1. Ballade, 2. L’Adieu, 3. Le Retour, 4. Pas villageois, 5. Sérénade, 6. Souvenir du bal
- Hommage à Rossini, Fantaisie pour violoncelle et orchestra
- Introduction, Prière et Boléro pour violoncelle et orchestra, Op.22

== Piano ==
- Décameron dramatique (1854, ten pieces dedicated to members of the Comédie-Française)
- (Short pieces) Les roses du Bengale. Six valses sentimentales, Dernier souvenir, Valse de zimmer, Abendblatter, Schuler-Polka, Les boules de neige, Ländler, Le fleuve d’or, Valse, Le postillon, Galop, Jacqueline, Suite de valses, Polka du mendiant, Les contes de la reine de Navarre, Grande valse, Souvenirs de Londres, Polka, Herminien-Walzer, Madeleine, Polka-Mazurka, Les belles Américaines, Valse, Burlesque Polka, Valse composée au château du Val le 9 aout 1845, Musette, Les amazones, Les arabesques, Berthe, Brunes et blondes, Les fleurs d’hivers.
- Souvenir d'Aix-les-Bains, suite de valses (1873, also orchestrated)

== Arrangements by other musicians ==
- Arranged and orchestrated by Manuel Rosenthal:
  - Gaîté Parisienne (1938) — a ballet score using Offenbach melodies
  - Offenbachiana (1953) – a symphonic suite on themes of Jacques Offenbach
  - La belle Hélène (1955, with Louis Aubert) – ballet-bouffe
