= Henry Bocage =

French playwright (1835–1917)

- Born: 1835
- Died: 14 October 1917 (aged 81–82)
- Occupation: Playwright
- Relatives: Bocage (uncle); Paul Bocage (brother)

Henry Bocage (1835 – 14 October 1917) was a French playwright of the second half of the 19th century. A nephew of the actor Bocage and younger brother of Paul Bocage, Hanry Bocage wrote comedies as well as novels.

An engineer by profession, he authored, alone or in collaboration, several successful plays on the Parisians stages of his time. Among them are:

comedies

- 1869: l’Architecte de ces dames
- 1871: la Canne de Damoclès
- 1874: Une fille d’Ève, OCLC 457726393, with Raymond Deslandes
- 1880: les Trois Bougies
- 1884: En partie fine
- 1890: la Vie à deux

opéras comiques

- 1880: la Girouette, with Étienne Hémery, music by À. Coedès,
- 1881: les Poupées de l’infante, music by Grisar.
