= Aristide Letorzec =

Aristide Letorzec more known under the pen name Lajariette (Nantes, 1808 – Paris, 18 November 1848) was a 19th-century French playwright and Pierre-Constant Letorzec's brother.

== Short biography ==
Among other plays, he made his actor debut in Zara ou la Sœur de l'Arabe (1837) or Geneviève de Brabant (1838) at the Théâtre des Folies-Dramatiques, before his own plays were presented on the most important Parisian stages of his time, including the Théâtre de la Gaîté, the Théâtre de la Porte-Saint-Martin, and the Théâtre du Vaudeville.

Letorzec was managing director of the Théâtre des Délassements-Comiques from 1843 until his death.

== Works ==
- 1839: Allons à la chaumière, vaudeville in 1 act, with Edmond-Frédéric Prieur
- 1843: Un mauvais père, drama in 3 acts, mingled with song, with Lubize
- 1843: La Première Cause, drama in 3 acts
- 1844: Paris diabolique, vaudeville in 1 act
- 1845: Les Enfants du facteur, drama in 3 acts, with Auguste-Louis-Désiré Boulé
- 1845: L'Homme et la Mode, comédie-vaudeville in 2 acts, with Lubize
- 1845: Parlez au portier, vaudeville in 1 act, with Adolphe d'Ennery
- 1845: Les Ruines de Vaudémont, four-act drama, with Boulé
- 1848: L'Ange de ma tante, comédie-vaudeville in 1 act, with Alfred Delacour

== Bibliography ==
- Joseph Marie Quérard, Les Supercheries littéraires dévoilées, 1850, p. 360.
- Joseph Marie Quérard, Félix Bourquelot, Charles Louandre, La Littérature française contemporaine. XIX, 1854, p. 123.
- J.M. Quérard, La France littéraire, 1857, p. 249.
- Henri Rossi, Le Diable dans le vaudeville au XIXe, 2003, p. 27.
