= Ferdinand Langlé =

French playwright and journalist

- Born: Joseph-Adophe-Adrien-Ferdinand Langlois; 21 November 1798; Paris
- Died: 18 October 1867 (aged 68)
- Occupation: Playwright

Ferdinand Langlé, full name Joseph-Adophe-Adrien-Ferdinand Langlois, (21 November 1798 – 18 October 1867) was a French playwright and journalist.

He was the founder of the Pompes funèbres générales company.

== Biography ==
Joseph Langlois is the son of Honoré Langlé (1741-1807), a French composer from Monaco.

After he studied medicine, he directed the "Compagnie générale des sépultures" before he established the "Entreprise générale des pompes funèbres" in 1828.

He then turned to literature. Under the pseudonyms Ferdinand, Eusèbe or Charles Odry, he wrote articles in several French newspapers as well as a certain number of theatre plays which were rather successful. He also published two anonymous works in old French: Les Contes du gay sçavoir, ballades, fabliaux et traditions du moyen âge (1828) and L’Historial du jongleur, chroniques et légendes françaises (1829).

Langlé died in 1867 aged 68, and was buried at Père-Lachaise Cemetery (13th division).

Two of his sons, Aylic (1827-1870) and Marie-Ange-Ferdinand (? – 1908), were also playwrights and journalists.

== Works (selection) ==
- 1822: Une journée à Montmorency, tableau-vaudeville in one act by Emmanuel Théaulon, Ramond and Ferdinand
- 1825: Apollon II, ou les Muses à Paris
- 1836: Maître Pathelin
- 1836: Venise au 6e étage
- 1836: la Manie des bals masqués
- 1839: La Jacquerie, opéra in four acts by Ferdinand Langlé and Alboize, music by Joseph Mainzer
