= Charles Labie =

19th-century French playwright

Charles Labie was a 19th-century French playwright.

His plays were presented on the most important Parisian stages of his time, including the Théâtre du Gymnase, the Théâtre de la Gaîté, the Théâtre du Palais-Royal, the Théâtre de la Porte-Saint-Martin, and the Théâtre des Variétés.

== Biography ==
It is thanks to Joséphin Soulary induction speech, delivered on July 11, 1882, during a public session at the Academy of Lyon, and Arts of Lyon, that we know the details of Labie’s life and work.

His plays were performed on the greatest stages in Paris—including the Théâtre de la Gaîté (rue Papin), the Théâtre du Palais-Royal, the Théâtre de la Porte-Saint-Martin, the Théâtre des Variétés, and the Théâtre du Vaudeville—as well as in Lyon—at the Théâtre des Célestins and the Théâtre du Gymnase Marie Bell—for some forty years, from 1834 to 1875.

== Works ==
- 1834: Le Commis et la grisette, one-act comédie en vaudevilles, with Paul de Kock and Charles Monier
- 1836: Jeune fille et roi, one-act comedy, mingled with songs, after from a short story by Mme Marceline Desbordes-Valmore, with Joanny Augier
- 1837: Le Cauchemar, revue of 1836
- 1837: La Nouvelle Héloïse, three-act drama, with Charles Desnoyer
- 1837: Le Cauchemar, revue lyonnaise of 1836, one-act vaudeville épisodique, with Joanny Augier
- 1837: Les Giboulées de mars, poisson d'avril en 11 morceaux, with Eugène de Lamerlière
- 1837: Micaela, ou la Folle de Marie de Bourgogne, three-act drama mingled with singing, from a short story by Alphonse Royer, with J. Augier
- 1837: L'Ombre de Nicolet, ou De plus fort en plus fort !, one-act vaudeville épisodique, with Desnoyer
- 1839: Les Femmes laides de Paris, one-act comédie en vaudevilles, with Joanny Augier
- 1839: La Maupin, ou Une vengeance d'actrice, one-act comédie en vaudevilles
- 1839: Le Mauvais sujet, one-act comédie en vaudevilles, with J.Augier and Adolphe Salvat
- 1840: Le Lion et le rat, two-act comédie en vaudevilles, with Saint-Amand
- 1841: Coucou !, one-act comédie en vaudevilles
- 1843: Gloire et perruque, one-act comédie en vaudevilles
- 1846: Les Fleurs animées, one-act comédie en vaudevilles, with Commerson and Xavier de Montépin
- 1846: Les Trois baisers, one-act comédie en vaudevilles, with de Montépin
- 1851: Drinn-Drinn, one-act comédie en vaudevilles, with Édouard Brisebarre and Eugène Nyon
- 1853: La Pompadour des Porcherons, one-act comédie en vaudevilles
- 1854: Jean Pain-Mollet, one-act comédie en vaudevilles
- 1856: La Cigale et la fourmi, saynète
- 1862: Un Merlan en bonne fortune, one-act comédie en vaudevilles, with Charles de Courcy and Varin
- 1865: Roland à Pont-de-Vaux, méli-mélo de grande et de petite musique in 4 acts
- undated: Une nuit de Venise, grand scene in 6 parts
