= Jean Pierre Charles Perrot de Renneville =

French playwright (1803–1874)

Jean Pierre Charles Perrot de Renneville (1803 – 5 October 1874) was a French playwright in the 19th-century.

== Career ==
As a commissioner-inspector of the Théâtres et Spectacles de Paris, his plays were presented on the most important Parisian stages of his time, including the Théâtre des Folies-Dramatiques, the Théâtre de l'Ambigu-Comique, and the Théâtre de l'Opéra.

=== Works ===
- 1837: Le Chemin de fer de Saint-Germain, one-act à-propos-vaudeville, with Henri de Tully and Adolphe Salvat
- 1845: L'Agent matrimonial, one-act vaudeville, with Adolphe Salvat
- 1847: Un Chapitre de Balzac, two-act comédie en vaudevilles
- 1849: La Filleule des fées, grand ballet-féerie in three acts and seven tableaux, preceded by a prologue
- 1853: Page et pensionnaire, one-act vaudeville, with Eugène Nantulle
- 1855: Hardi comme un page, two-act vaudeville
- 1858: Le Quinze août, ou le Rêve d'un soldat, à-propos mingled with couplets
- 1861: Les Anciens et les nouveaux, one-act à-propos militaire et populaire
- 1862: La Pupille de la garde, ou Un souvenir d'Italie, one-act à-propos mingled with couplets, with Eugene Nantulle
- 1862: Qui crève les yeux, les paye, one-act comedy, with Ernest Buffault
- 1863: Paul et Virginie dans une mansarde, one-act vaudeville, with Alfred Séguin
- 1866: À la salle de police, military sketch in one act, mingled with song

== Bibliography ==
- Joseph-Marie Quérard, Charles Louandre, La Littérature française contemporaine : XIX, 1854, p. 643
