= Paul Faulquemont =

French playwright and journalist (1805–1872)

Pierre-Charles Lamarle also known as Paul Faulquemont or Paul de Faulquemont (Metz, 14 October 1805 (22 vendémiaire an XIV – 19th arrondissement of Paris, 15 Decembre 1872) was a 19th-century French playwright and journalist.

== Biography ==
It is unclear when and under what circumstances this son of an attorney to the trial court for Metz embarked on a career as a journalist in Paris. Still, he became editor of L'Europe théâtrale and La France industrielle and collaborated with many Parisian newspapers, including L'Indépendance dramatique and Le Tintamarre by Touchatout.

He also authored dramas and comedies, mostly written in collaboration and only part of which has been printed.

When he died aged 67, his obituary in the 23 February issue of Le Tintamarre was written by its director and chief editor, Léon Bienvenu

== Theatre ==
- 1844: Aubry le boucher, four-act drama, with Henry Marcaille, Théâtre Beaumarchais (24 October)
- 1845: Barbeau fils aîné, with Auguste Vitu, Théâtre Beaumarchais (February) [unprinted]
- 1845: Perlerinette, ou les Francs Jobards, one-act vaudeville, with Auguste Vitu, Théâtre du Luxembourg (April) [unprinted]
- 1845 : La Grande Bourse et les Petites Bourses, one-act à-propos-vaudeville, with Clairville, Théâtre du Vaudeville (8 November)
- 1846: Les Sauvages pour rire, one-act vaudeville, with Auguste Vitu and Théodore Barrière, Théâtre du Luxembourg (February) [unprinted]
- 1846: Paquita, three-act ballet-vaudeville, with Paul Foucher, music by Jules Bariller, Académie royale de musique (1 April) Text online
- 1846: Le Prisonnier sur parole, three-act dram, with Paul Foucher, Théâtre Beaumarchais (6 June)
- 1847: Les Chroniques bretonnes, pièce fantastique in 1 act, with Clairville and Théodore Barrière, Théâtre des Variétés (28 November)
- 1851: Un fameux numéro !, one-act vaudeville, with Émile Colliot and Hippolyte Lefebvre, Théâtre des Variétés (17 August)
- 1852: Les Deux Inséparables, one-act comédie en vaudeville, with Léon Lelarge, Théâtre des Variétés (28 November)
- 1852: Le Colonel Chabert, ou la Femme à deux maris, five-act drama, with Adolphe Favre, after Balzac, Théâtre Beaumarchais
- 1860: Les Portraits-Cartes, one-act vaudeville, with Adolphe Favre, Théâtre de la Gaîté (16 December)
- 1860: Le Marchand de parapluies, revue of the year 1860, in three acts, with Jean-Louis-Auguste Commerson, Théâtre Beaumarchais (17 December)
- 1862: L'Orfèvre du Pont-au-change, ou Paris en 1480, five-act drama, with Adolphe Favre, Théâtre Beaumarchais (13 December)
- 1863: Le Capitaine Balthazar, five-act drama, with Léon Marcy, Théâtre Beaumarchais (22 August)
- 1864: Un martyr de la victoire, drame en 5 actes, dont un prologue, de Faulquemont et Adolphe Favre, Théâtre de Belleville (26 juin)
- 1866: Les Vraies Filles de marbre, one-act vaudeville, with Léon Taratte, Théâtre des Nouveautés (26 May) [unprinted]
- 1871: Le Siège des épiciers, three-act vaudeville, with Bugnet, Théâtre des Menus-Plaisirs (27 March) [unprinted]
