= Amable =

Amable is a French given name. Notable people with the name include:

- Amable Aristy (1949–2022), Dominican politician and businessman
- Amable Audin (1899–1990), French archaeologist
- Amable Bapaume (1825–1895), French novelist, journalist and playwright
- Amable de Courtais (1790–1877), French soldier and politician
- Amable Guillaume Prosper Brugière, baron de Barante (1782–1866), French statesman and historian
- Amable Bélanger (1846–1919), Canadian iron founder, industrialist and community leader
- Amable Berthelot (1777–1847), Quebec lawyer, author and political figure
- Amable de Bourzeys (1606–1672), French churchman, writer, hellenist, and Academician
- Amable Dionne (1782–1852), Canadian businessman, seigneur and political figure
- Amable Éno, dit Deschamps (1785–1875), political figure in Quebec
- Amable Jodoin (1828–1880), businessman and political figure in Quebec
- Amable Jourdain (1788–1818), French historian and orientalist
- Amable Liñán (born 1934), Spanish aeronautical engineer
- Amable Ricard (1828–1876), French politician
- Amable de Saint-Hilaire (1795–1865), French dramatist
- Amable Tastu (1795–1885), French femme de lettres
- Amable Troude (1762–1824), French Navy officer of the Napoleonic Wars
