= Eugène Guinot =

French journalist, writer and playwright (1805–1861)

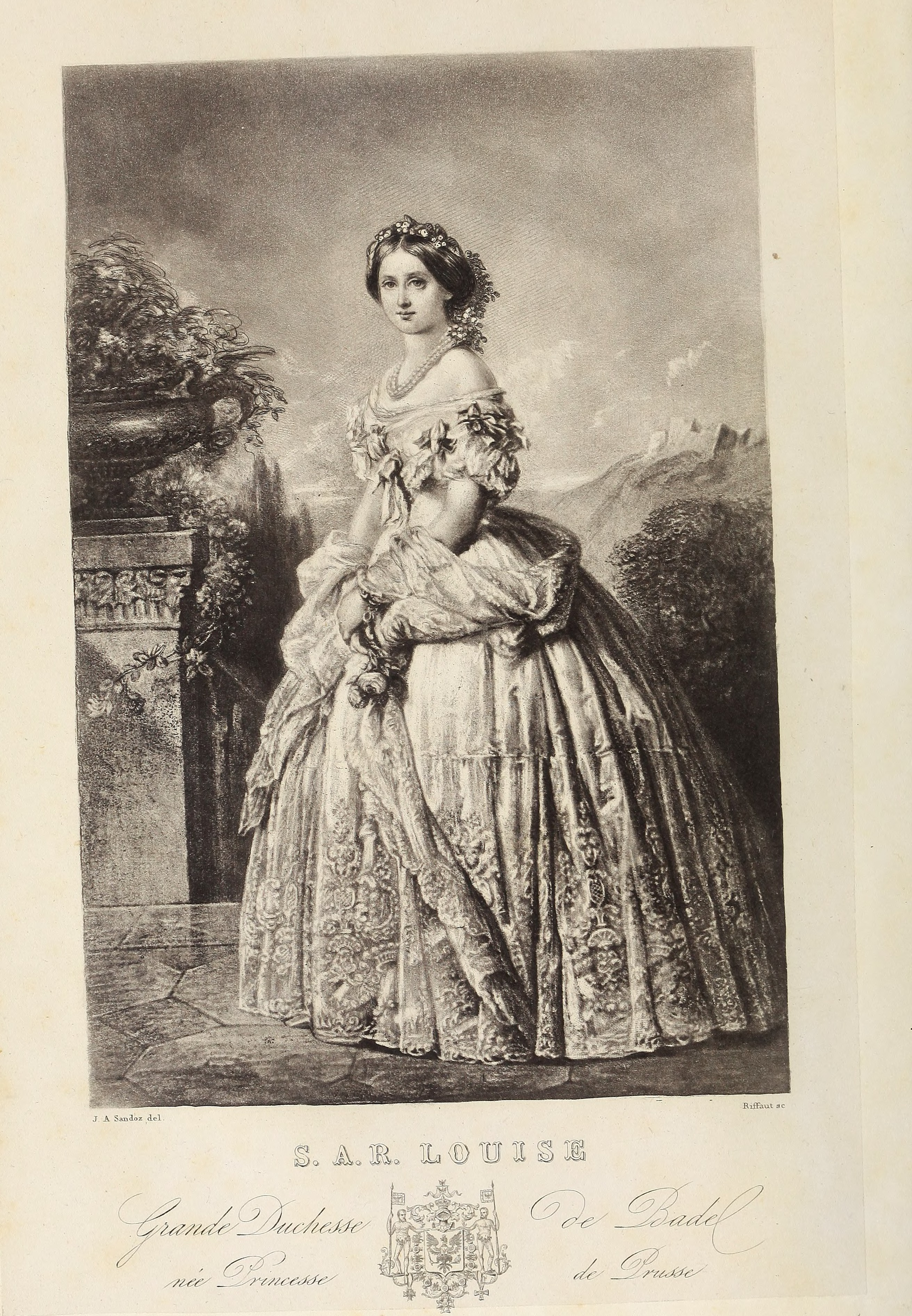
- Illustration from L'été à Bade (1861) by Eugène Guinot
- Born: 8 April 1805; Marseille
- Died: 9 February 1861 (aged 55); Saint-Germain-en-Laye
- Occupations: Playwright, journalist

Eugène Guinot (8 April 1805 – 9 February 1861) was a French journalist, writer and playwright, creator of the Parisian chronique

== Biography ==
He collaborated among others with the Revue de Paris and Le Siècle, signing sometimes his texts under the pen names Paul Vermond or Pierre Durand. A trendy writer in his time, he authored many serial published by great publishing houses such as Hetzel, Hachette or Michel Lévy Frères among others. His plays were presented in the most important Parisian stages of the 19th century: Théâtre des Variétés, Théâtre du Vaudeville, Théâtre du Gymnase-Dramatique etc.

== Works ==
- 1837: Suzanne, comédie en vaudevilles in 2 acts, with Mélesville
- 1839: Lekain à Draguignan, comedy in 2 acts, with Philippe-Auguste-Alfred Pittaud de Forges
- 1841: Une Nuit au sérail, comedy en 3 acts, mingled with song, with de Forges
- 1841: Listrac, serial
- 1841: Physiologie du provincial à Paris, with Carolus-Duran, illustration by Paul Gavarni
- 1841: L'écu de cent sous, serial
- 1842: Les Mémoires du diable, comedy in three acts, with Étienne Arago
- 1843: Jacquot, vaudeville en 1 act
- 1843: Le bon œil, serial
- 1843: Le bouquet de violettes, serial
- 1843: Le chalet, serial
- 1843: Un héros de roman, serial
- 1843: Les maris malheureux, short story
- 1843: Le inconvénients de la vertu, serial
- 1843: L'Ogresse, ou Un mois au Pérou, comédie en vaudevilles in 2 acts
- 1844: L'ami du ministre, serial
- 1844: La Polka, vaudeville in 1 act, with Frédéric Bérat
- 1845: Le conciliateur, serial
- 1845: La famille Wilberston, serial
- 1845: L'héritière, short story
- 1845: Paris à cheval, revue cavalière en 5 relais, with Carmouche
- 1845: Les succès, serial
- 1845: Un tuteur de vingt ans, comédie en vaudevilles in 2 acts, with Mélesville
- 1846: La Provence ancienne et moderne, 1846
- 1847: L'Enfant de l'amour ou Les deux marquis de Saint-Jacques, comédie en vaudevilles in 3 acts, with Jean-François-Alfred Bayard
- 1847: La Cour de Biberach, comédie en vaudevilles in 1 act, with Édouard Lafargue
- 1847: Les Bords du Rhin
- 1847: L'amoureux et le bandit, serial
- 1847: Le dévouement d'une femme, serial
- 1847: Les exilés de Wissbade, serial
- 1847: La femme aux cinq maris, serial
- 1847: Enghien et la vallée de Montmorency, précédé d'une description historique du parcours du chemin de fer du Nord, 1847
- 1847: Le pactole, short story
- 1848: Le Lion et le rat, comédie en vaudevilles in 1 act, with Adolphe de Leuven
- 1848: Le Marquis de Lauzun, comedy in 1 act, mingled with couplets, with Carmouche
- 1848: La belle cauchoise, comédie en vaudevilles in 1 act, with Gabriel de Lurieu
- 1849: J'attends un omnibus, vaudeville in 1 act
- 1849: La Tasse cassée, comédie en vaudevilles in 1 act, with Lubize
- 1850: Le provincial à Paris, illustration by Gavarni
- 1850: Colombine, ou les Sept péchés capitaux, comédie en vaudevilles in 1 act, with Pierre Carmouche
- 1850: Le Maître d'armes, comédie en vaudevilles in 1 act
- 1850: La Restauration des Stuarts, historical drama in 5 acts
- 1851: Encore des mousquetaires, vaudeville in 1 act, with Charles Varin
- 1851: Les Aventures de Suzanne, drama in 5 acts and 8 tableaux, with Charles Dupeuty
- 1851: Une belle aventurière, serial
- 1851: Un héros du roman moderne, short story
- 1851: Une récréation champêtre, short story
- 1851: Jean le Postillon, monologue on the song by F. Bérat, with Carmouche
- 1851: Souvenir des eaux de Spa, short story
- 1852: Chez Dantan, novel
- 1852: Le mariage forcé, short story
- 1852: Scapin, comedy in 1 act, mingled with couplets, with Carmouche
- 1852: Soirées d'avril, novel
- 1853: A Summer at Baden-Baden
- 1853: Itinéraire du chemin de fer de Paris à Bruxelles, comprenant l'embranchement de Creil à Saint-Quentin
- 1854: Promenade au château de Compiègne et aux ruines de Pierrefonds et de Coucy
- 1854: Un frère terrible, comédie en vaudevilles in 1 act, with Dupeuty
- 1855: De Paris à Boulogne, à Calais et à Dunkerque
- 1857: Les chiens de Saint Malo, serial
- 1857: Le premier pas, serial
- 1857: Une victime, serial
- 1857: Un vieux beau, comédie en vaudevilles in 1 act
- 1858: Ce que c'est qu'une Parisienne, Les Maîtresses à Paris, Les Veuves du diable, novels, with Léon Gozlan
- 1861: L'été à Bade
- 1869: Le Provincial à Paris, posth.

== Bibliography ==
- Zénaïde Fleuriot, Alfred Nettement, Victor Lecoffre, La Semaine des familles: revue universelle hebdomadaire, 1861, p. 352 (nécrologie) (Read on line)
- J. Madival, Annuaire des faits, résumé universel chronologique..., 1862, p. 62
- Gustave Vapereau, Dictionnaire universel des contemporains, 1865, p. 816 (Read on line)
- Pierre Guiral, Félix Reynaud, Les Marseillais dans l'histoire, 1988, p. 138
- Stéphane Michaud, Flora Tristan, la paria et son rêve: correspondance, 2003, p. 90
- Pierre Échinard, Marseille à la une: l'âge d'or de la presse au XIXe siècle, 2007, p. 48-50
