= Hippolyte-Jules Demolière =

French playwright (1802–1877)

- Born: 3 August 1802; Nantes
- Died: 26 December 1877 (aged 75); Saint-Denis
- Occupations: Novelisr, plawright

Hippolyte-Jules Demolière (3 August 1802 – 26 December 1877) was a 19th-century French novelist and playwright.

After he was a secretary in the French Provisional Government of 1848, he held a position within the Secretariat of the Executive under général Cavaignac.

Under the pseudonym Moléri, Demolière published, alone or in collaboration, numerous feuilletons, some of which were later published in volumes, as well as vaudevilles, Railway guides and gardening manuals.

== Main publications ==
Novels published in volumes

- 1830: L'Exposition de tableaux, ou le Faussaire (4 volumes)
- 1833: Le Czarewitz Constantin et Jeannette Grudzinska, ou les Jacobins polonais, with J. Czynski (2 volumes)
- 1837–1838: La Fille de Pauvre Jacques, with Edme Chauffer (4 volumes)
- 1856: Petits drames bourgeois, études de mœurs (2 volumes)
- 1858: Fièvres du jour : la Famille Guillaume; l'Institutrice; un vieux lion
- 1862: La Traite des blanches
- 1865: Or et misère
- 1866: L'Amour de la musique
- 1867: La Terre promise

Theatre

- Lébao, ou le Nègre, drame-vaudeville in 3 acts, with Chardon, Paris, Théâtre du Panthéon, 19 November 1835
- Guillaume Norwood, ou Une haine de vieillards, drama in 3 acts, with Hippolyte Rimbaut, Paris, Théâtre de la Gaîté, 25 November 1838
- Le Marquis de Brancas, comedy in 3 acts, mingled with songs, after a short story by M. A. de Lavergne, with Charles Henri Ladislas Laurençot and Hippolyte Rimbaut, Paris, Théâtre du Panthéon, 2 November 1839
- L'Habit fait le moine, comédie-vaudeville in 1 act, with Charles Henri Ladislas Laurençot, Paris, Théâtre des Folies-Dramatiques, 22 December 1840
- Le Corrégidor de Pampelune, comedy in 1 act, with Altaroche, Paris, Théâtre de l'Odéon, 23 March 1843
- La Famille Renneville, drama in 3 acts and in prose, with Charles Henri Ladislas Laurençot, Paris, Second Théâtre-Français, 11 May 1843
- La Jeunesse de Charles XII, comédie-vaudeville in 2 acts, Paris, Théâtre des Folies-Dramatiques, 25 July 1843
- Tôt ou tard, comedy in 3 acts and in prose, with Charles Henri Ladislas Laurençot, Paris, Théâtre de l'Odéon, 6 October 1843
- Le Gendre d'un millionnaire, comedy in 5 acts and in prose, with Charles Henri Ladislas Laurençot, Paris, Théâtre-Français, 25 February 1845
- Un fils, s'il vous plaît, comédie-vaudeville in 1 act, with Edme Chauffer, Paris, Théâtre de la Gaîté, 28 August 1845
- Entre l'arbre et l'écorce, comédie-vaudeville in 1 act, with Charles Henri Ladislas Laurençot, Paris, Théâtre du Gymnase, 30 September 1845
- La Famille, comedy in 5 acts and in prose, Paris, Théâtre de l'Odéon, 3 May 1849
- Un valet sans livrée, comedy in 1 act in prose, with Charles Henri Ladislas Laurençot, Paris, Théâtre de l'Odéon, 9 October 1850
- La Tante Ursule, comedy in 2 acts in prose, Paris, Théâtre de l'Odéon, 26 September 1852
- Les Revers de la médaille, comedy in 3 acts, in prose, with Charles Henri Ladislas Laurençot, Paris, Théâtre de l'Odéon, 24 September 1861

Varia

- Itinéraire du chemin de fer de Paris à Strasbourg, comprenant les embranchements d'Épernay à Reims et de Frouard à Forbach (1853)
- Guides-itinéraires. De Paris à Corbeil et à Orléans (1854)
- Petit dictionnaire manuel du jardinier amateur (1865)
- Petit manuel du jardinier, à l'usage des jardiniers-fleuristes, maraîchers (1873)
