= Armand Durantin =

French playwright and novelist (1818–1891)

- Born: Anne-Adrien-Armand Durantin; 4 April 1818; Senlis, France
- Died: 30 December 1891 (aged 73); Boursonne, Oise, France
- Occupations: Playwright novelist

Anne-Adrien-Armand Durantin, also called Armand de Villevert, (4 April 1818 – 30 December 1891) was a 19th-century French playwright and novelist.

== Biography ==
First a lawyer, Durantin turned to literature and collaborated with the France littéraire and the Echo français as well as with other magazines. He then began to write theatre plays but success remained modest until the day the Théâtre du Gymnase announced a comedy in four acts, without the author's name, entitled Heloise Paranquet. How Montigny, then director of the Gymnase, had mounted this play aroused public attention. The success the play obtained, thanks to the skilful handling of dramatic situations, had critics trying to find who the author was, a name that the Cabinet littéraire soon unveiled. Only later was it learned that Durantin had benefited the collaboration of Alexandre Dumas fils. Durantin also injected his legal expertise in this play, but when he tried to repeat the feat with Thérèse Humbert two years later, the public did not follow him.

Among his novels, the Carnet d'un libertin, whose hero succumbs to a terrible disease after having exhausted all the debauchery, has the particularity of featuring the "scientific monstrosities" of musée Dupuytren.

A Parisisan street in the Montmartre area, has been named after him since 1881.

== Publications ==
Theatre

- 1840: La Guimard, one-act comedy, mingled with couplets, Paris, Théâtre du Panthéon, 16 June
- 1840: L'Auberge du crime, ou les Canards, one-act vaudeville, with Théophile Deyeux, Théâtre du Panthéon, 13 December
- 1842: Les Amours d'un rat, one-act vaudeville, with Jules de Rieux, Théâtre du Panthéon, 21 February
- 1843: Un déshonneur posthume, one-act comedy, in verse, Second Théâtre-Français, 15 March
- 1843: Un tour de roulette, comedy in 1 act and in prose, with Jules de Rieux, Second Théâtre-Français, 27 March
- 1843: L'Italien et le bas-breton, ou la Confusion des langues, one-act comédie en vaudeville, Théâtre du Gymnase-Dramatique, 18 November
- 1844: L'Oncle à succession, two-act comédie en vaudeville, Théâtre du Gymnase-Dramatique, 20 March
- 1846: Le Serpent sous l'herbe, one-act comédie en vaudeville, Théâtre du Gymnase-Dramatique, 10 June
- 1846: Les Spéculateurs, five-act drama, in prose, with Émile Fontaine, Théâtre-Français, 27 June
- 1848: Le Mariage par procuration, one-act comédie en vaudeville, with Raymond Deslandes, Théâtre du Vaudeville, 8 June
- 1849: Les Viveurs de la Maison d'Or, two-act comedy, in prose, with Louis Monrose, Second Théâtre-Français, 7 March
- 1849: La Mort de Strafford, five-act drama, Second Théâtre-Français, 8 March
- 1850: Les Trois Racan, one-act comedy, drawn from Tallemand Des Réaux's memoirs, with Raymond Deslandes, Théâtre-Historique, 25 June
- 1852: Les Gaîtés champêtres, two-act comédie-vaudeville, after Jules Janin, with Charles Desnoyer and Léon Guillard, Théâtre du Vaudeville, 3 July
- 1853: La Terre promise, three-act comédie en vaudeville, with Raymond Deslandes, Théâtre du Vaudeville, 24 January
- 1855: La Femme d'un grand homme, five-act comedy, in prose, with Raymond Deslandes, Second Théâtre-Français, 5 February
- 1858: Monsieur Acker, one-act comedy, Théâtre du Gymnase-Dramatique, 15 August
- 1859: Les Comédiens de salons, one-act caricature, with Auguste Anicet-Bourgeois, Théâtre du Vaudeville, 18 March
- 1866: Héloïse Paranquet, four-act play, Théâtre du Gymnase, 20 JanuaryText online
- 1868: Thérèse Humbert, three-act comedy, Théâtre du Gymnase, 19 October
- 1875: Une pêche miraculeuse, two-acty comedy, with Eugène Nus, Théâtre du Vaudeville, 11 March

Novels and varia

- 1863: La Légende de l'homme éternel Text online
- 1864: Domaine de la couronne. Palais de Saint-Cloud, résidence impériale, with Philippe de Saint-Albin Text online
- 1873: L'Héritage de la folie
- 1874: Mariage de prêtre
- 1879: Le Carnet d'un libertin Text online
- 1879: L'Halluciné
- 1879: L'Excommunié Text online
- 1879: Un jésuite de robe courte
- 1882: Histoire d'Héloïse Paranquet et manuscrit primitif ayant servi à M. Alexandre Dumas pour retoucher la pièce que lui a portée M. Armand Durantin et qui s'appelait alors « Mademoiselle de Breuil »
- 1885: Le Carnaval de Nice
- 1889: Un élève des Jésuites

== Distinctions ==
- Chevalier of the Légion d'honneur (9 August 1870 decree)

== Sources ==
- Pierre Larousse, Grand Dictionnaire universel du XIXe siècle, vol. VI, 1870, p. 1483
- Gustave Vapereau, Dictionnaire universel des contemporains, Hachette, Paris, 1880, p. 638
