= Charles de Courcy =

French dramatist and journalist (1834–1917)

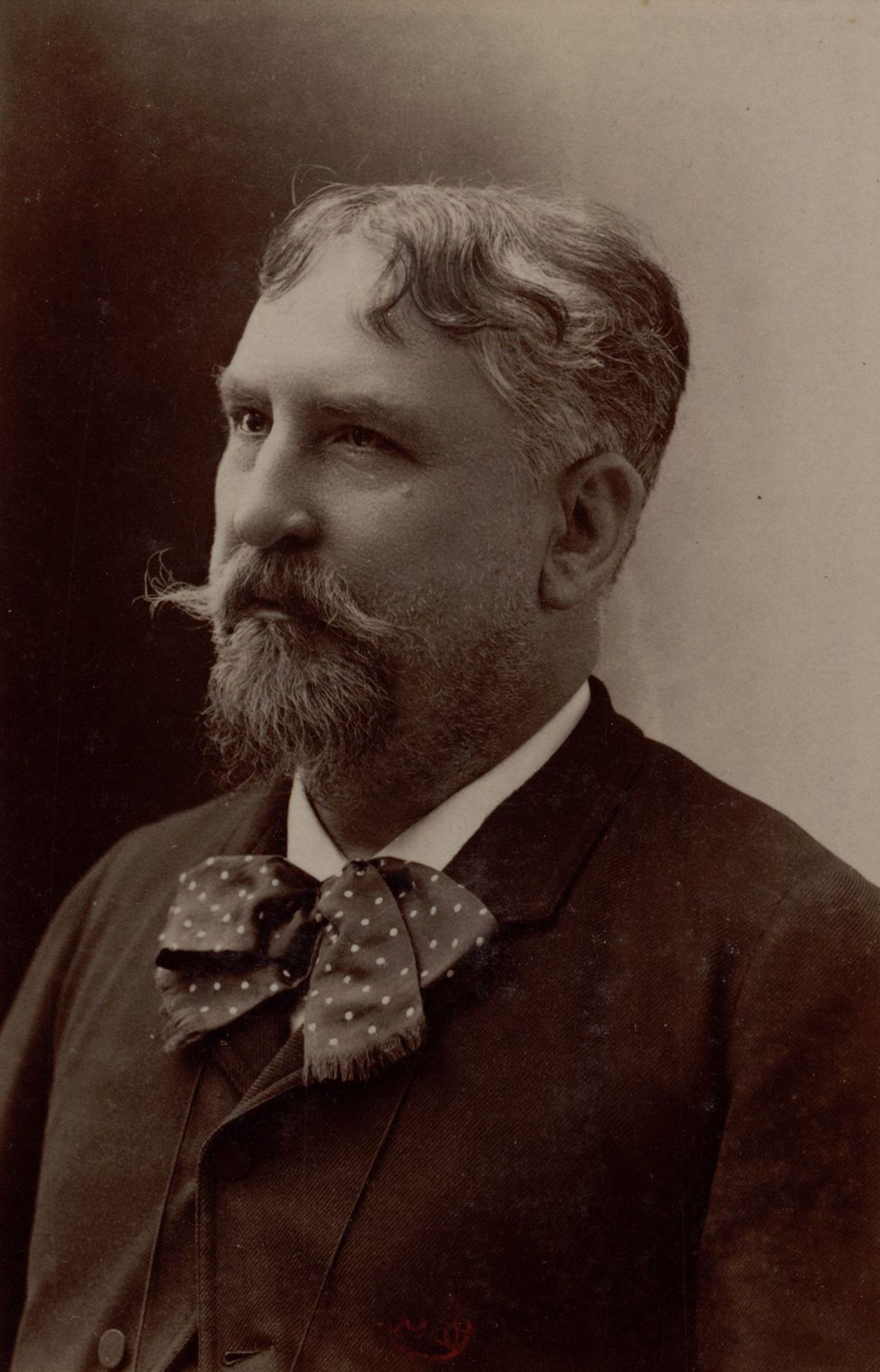
- Charles de Courcy (atelier Nadar)
- Born: 22 August 1836; Passy, Paris
- Died: 12 December 1917 (aged 81); Meaux
- Occupations: Dramatists; Journalist

Charles Henry Charlot de Courcy (22 August 1834 – 12 December 1917) was a 19th-century French dramatist and journalist.

He was the son of dramatist, poet and chansonnier Frédéric de Courcy (1796–1862).

A journalist at L'Illustration, his plays were presented, among others, at the Théâtre du Gymnase, the Théâtre de l'Odéon, the Théâtre du Vaudeville and the Comédie-française.

== Works ==
- 1853: Un Merlan en bonne fortune, comédie en vaudevilles in 1 act, with Charles Labie and Varin
- 1853: La Pompadour des Porcherons, comédie en vaudevilles in 1 act, with Labie
- 1858: Entre Hommes, pochade in 1 acte, mingled with couplets
- 1860: Daniel Lambert, drama in 5 acts, en prose
- 1861: Les Histoires du café de Paris, Michel Lévy
- 1861: Le Chemin le plus long, comedy in 3 acts, in prose
- 1862: Diane de Valneuil, comedy in 5 acts, in prose
- 1865: La Marieuse, comedy in 2 acts, with Lambert-Thiboust
- 1872: Les Vieilles Filles, comedy in 5 acts, in prose, with Victorien Sardou
- 1876: Andrette, comedy in 1 act, in prose
- 1876: Mademoiselle Didier, 4-act play, in prose, with Eugène Nus
- 1881: Madame de Navaret, 3-act play, with Eugène Nus
- 1882: Un mari malgré lui, 1-act comedy, with E. Nus
- 1883: Toujours !, 1 act comedy
- 1890: Une Conversion, 1-act comedy, in prose

== Bibliography ==
- Pierre Larousse, Grand dictionnaire universel du XIXe siècle, 1866, (p. 281)
- Gustave Vapereau, Dictionnaire universel des contemporains, 1870, (p. 497)
- Edmond de Goncourt, Jules de Goncourt, Journal; Mémoires de la Vie Littéraire: 1891-1896, 1956, (p. 1077)
