= Alfred Séguin =

French novelist and playwright

François-Léo Séguin called Alfred Séguin (22 November 1825, Baignes-Sainte-Radegonde – c. 1900) was a 19th-century French novelist and playwright.

A tax civil servant, his plays were presented, inter alia, at the Théâtre des Délassements-Comiques and the Théâtre de la Porte-Saint-Antoine.

== Works ==
- 1860: À bon chat, bon rat !, vaudeville-opéretta in 1 act
- 1862: Rondes et rondeaux chantés... dans les Folies de Montmartre, Dubois and E. Vert
- 1865: Le Jour de l'an, one-act comédie en vaudevilles
- 1865 Paul et Virginie dans une mansarde, one-act comédie en vaudevilles, with Jean Pierre Charles Perrot de Renneville
- 1867: Les Hommes en grève, new vaudeville in 4 acts, with Édouard Hermil
- 1871: Paris ne mourra pas !, P.-M. Cadoret
- 1875: Bengali, ou les Fils du paria followed by À vol d'oiseau, Didier
- 1876: La Petite Franchette, ou Tout est bien qui finit bien, one-act comédie en vaudevilles
- 1877: Le Robinson noir, P. Ducrocq
- 1877: Le Talisman de Marguerite, Didier
- 1877: Théâtre de jeunes gens, T. Olmer
- 1879: Le Courrier persan, J. Bonhoure
- 1879: Les Finesses de Pierrette, one-act comedy
- 1887: Si j'étais grand !, A. Picard et Kaan
- 1891: Les Infortunes de Simonne, A. Picard et Kaan
- 1894: Les Petits coureurs des bois, A. Picard et Kaan
- 1897: Lise, Lisette et Lison, A. Picard et Kaan
- 1897: Les Promesses de Mlle Augustine, A. Picard et Kaan
