= Amable Bapaume =

French writer (1825–1895)

- Born: 26 March 1825; Yvetot, France
- Died: 7 July 1898 (aged 73); Paris, France
- Occupations: Writer; Playwright; Journalist

Amable Bapaume (26 March 1825 – 7 July 1895) was a 19th-century French novelist, journalist and playwright.

== Biography ==
For several years, Bapaume was a teacher in Paris at the collège Sainte-Barbe and the institution Massin. In 1847, he published a first novel, Juana la Lionne. In the 1860s, under the pen name "Henri Normand", he had several comédies en vaudeville published, most of them written in collaboration with Jean-Louis-Auguste Commerson, then director of Le Tintamarre. Having abandoned teaching, Bapaume contributed a number of humorous articles to this newspaper, including a series of Medallions etching which earned him some trouble with certain fellow of actresses of whom he had drawn very unflattering portraits.

When Commerson sold the Tintamarre to Touchatout and revived the Tam-Tam in 1872, Bapaume followed him and wrote there articles under the name "Commodore". Like the Tintamarre, the Tam-Tam was "the newspaper of choice for the insane fantasy and jokes with punch." This unbridled imagination and cheerfully mocking tone are found in La Rome tintamarresque, histoire drolatique et anecdotique de Rome depuis sa fondation jusqu'au moyen âge et de Napoléon Ier, histoire tamtamarresque du grand homme, that Bapaume published between 1870 and 1872. After he became both the owner and chief editor of the Tam-Tam after Commerson died in 1879, he continued to publish novels into old age.

== Works ==
Theatre

- 1863: Les Égarements de deux billets de banque, two-act comédie en vaudeville, Paris, Théâtre Déjazet, 16 January
- 1864: La Vengeance de Pistache, one-act vaudeville, with Commerson, Paris, Théâtre Déjazet, 26 May
- 1866: Doña Framboisias, one-act folie-vaudeville, with Commerson, Paris, Théâtre des Folies-Marigny, 6 July
- 1867: Les Vacances de Cadichet, one-act vaudeville, with Commerson, Paris, Théâtre des Folies-Dramatiques, 22 July
- 1869: X. Q. P. G., one-act vaudeville, Paris, Théâtre des Folies-Dramatiques, 9 March

Varia

- 1846: Un Anniversaire. Anniversaire du 13 juillet 1842 Text online
- 1847: Juana la Lionne, ou les Jeunes gens d'aujourd'hui, novel, 3 vol. Text online 1 2
- 1852: Oncles et Neveux, ou Rome sous Jules César et Auguste et la France sous Napoléon Bonaparte et Louis-Napoléon, play in verse, Text online
- 1870: La Rome tintamarresque, histoire drôlatique et anecdotique de Rome depuis sa fondation jusqu'au moyen âge, foreword by Commerson
- 1872: Napoléon Ier, histoire tamtamarresque du grand homme, foreword by Commerson
- 1878: Cœur de lionne, novel
- 1882:Les Requins de Paris, novel
- 1888: Le Cocher de la duchesse, novel

== Sources ==
- Angelo De Gubernatis, Dictionnaire international des écrivains du jour, Florence, L. Niccolai, t. 1, 1888, (p. 147).
