= Mademoiselle Judith =

French actress

Julie Bernat (30 January 1827 – 27 October 1912), known by her stage name of Mademoiselle Judith, was a French actress.

== Life ==
She entered the Comédie-Française company in 1846 and was made its 274th Sociétaire in 1852. She left the company in 1866.

== Appearances ==
=== Comédie-Française ===
- 1846: Le Barbier de Séville by Beaumarchais: Rosine
- 1847: Un poète by Jules Barbier: Laetice
- 1847: Pour arriver by Émile Souvestre: Juliette
- 1847: Le Misanthrope by Molière: Eliante
- 1847: Tartuffe by Molière: Mariane
- 1847: Les Aristocraties by Étienne Arago: Laurence
- 1847: Un caprice by Alfred de Musset: Mathilde
- 1847: Dom Juan ou le Festin de pierre by Molière: Elvire
- 1848: Le Puff ou Mensonge et vérité by Eugène Scribe: Antonia
- 1848: Thersite by Villarceaux: Niséis
- 1848: Le roi attend by George Sand: Madeleine Béjart
- 1848: La Marquise d'Aubray by Charles Lafont: Valentine
- 1848: La Rue Quincampoix by Jacques-François Ancelot: Jeanne
- 1849: L'Amitié des femmes by Édouard-Joseph-Ennemond Mazères: Marguerite
- 1849: Louison by Alfred de Musset: la duchesse
- 1849: Passe-temps de duchesse by Gaston de Montheau: la duchesse
- 1850: Trois entr'actes pour l'Amour médecin by Alexandre Dumas: la Du Croisy
- 1850: Charlotte Corday by François Ponsard: Charlotte Corday
- 1850: La Queue du chien d'Alcibiade by Léon Gozlan: Adeline
- 1850: La Migraine by Jean-Pons-Guillaume Viennet: Madame Dhéricourt
- 1850: Le Mariage de Figaro by Beaumarchais: la comtesse
- 1850: Un mariage sous la Régence by Léon Guillard: la duchesse de Berry
- 1851: Christian et Marguerite by Pol Mercier et Édouard Fournier: Delphine
- 1851: Les Bâtons flottants by Pierre-Chaumont Liadières: Madamoisselle Duvernet
- 1853: Le Lys dans la vallée by Théodore Barrière and Arthur de Beauplan after Honoré de Balzac: la comtesse Henriette de Mortsauf
- 1856: Tartuffe by Molière: Elmire
- 1858: Le Bourgeois gentilhomme by Molière: Dorimène
- 1859: Souvent homme varie by Auguste Vacquerie: Fideline
- 1861: Les Femmes savantes by Molière: Armande

=== Other companies ===
- 1876: La Reine Margot by Alexandre Dumas, théâtre de la Porte Saint-Martin: Catherine de Médici
