= Aylic Langlé =

French dramaturge and official (1827–1870)

- Born: Marie-Joseph-Adolphe-Alexandre Langlois; 11 October 1827; Former 1st arrondissement of Paris
- Died: 13 January 1870 (aged 42); 10th arrondissement of Paris
- Occupations: Playwright, journalist
- Spouse: Marie-Euphrasine Benoist

Signature
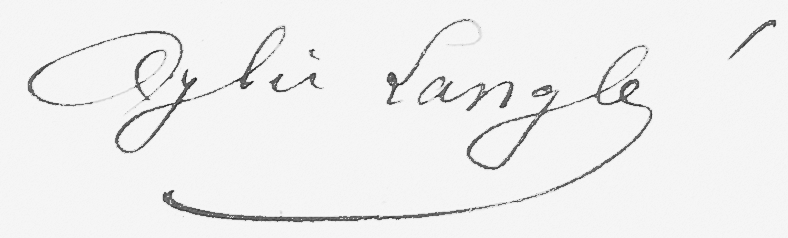

Marie-Joseph-Adolphe-Alexandre Langlois, better known as Aylic Langlé (11 October 1827 – 13 January 1870) was a 19th-century French playwright, journalist and official.

== Biography ==
The son of the playwright Ferdinand Langlé and of Cécila de Milhau, grandson of the composer Honoré Langlé, the writer Marie-Ange-Ferdinand Langlois (? – 1908) and Charles-Édouard Langlois were his brothers.

He married Marie-Euphrasine Benoist (died in 1866), with whom he had a daughter, Marie-Georgina (1860-1930) who would become a writer.

He died from a stroke aged 42.

== Works ==
- 1853: Murillo ou la Corde de pendu, comedy in 3 acts and in free verse, Comédie-Française (18 October)
- 1863: Un homme de rien, comédie-vaudeville in 4 acts, Théâtre du Vaudeville
- 1864: La Toile d'araignée, comedy
- 1864: La Jeunesse de Mirabeau, vaudeville in 4 acts, with Raymond Deslandes, Théâtre du Vaudeville (11 November)

== Distinctions ==
- Chevalier of the Légion d'honneur (22 June 1863 decree).
- Officer of the Légion d'honneur (7 August 1869 decree)
