= Boursonne =

- Commune
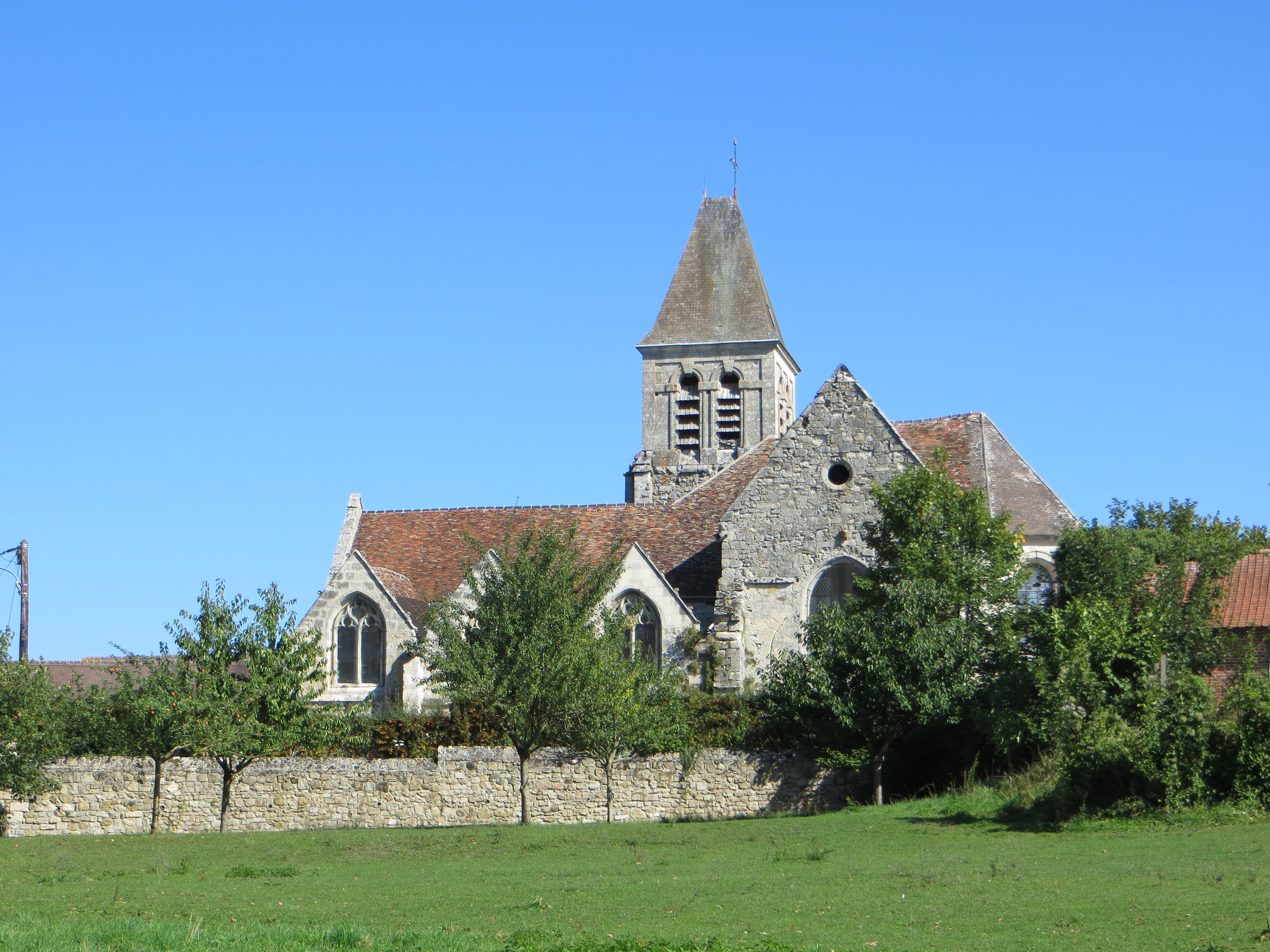
- The church in Boursonne
- Location of Boursonne
- Location within France Location within Hauts-de-France
- Coordinates: 49°12′12″N 3°02′46″E
- Country: France
- Region: Hauts-de-France
- Department: Oise
- Arrondissement: Senlis
- Canton: Nanteuil-le-Haudouin
- Intercommunality: Pays de Valois

Government
  - Mayor (2020–2026): Sylvain Collard
- Area^{1}: 3.44 km^{2} (1.33 sq mi)
- Elevation: 140 m (460 ft)
- Highest elevation: 149 m (489 ft)
- Lowest elevation: 100 m (330 ft)
- Population (2023): 303
  - Density: 88.1/km^{2} (228/sq mi)
- Time zone: UTC+01:00 (CET)
  - Summer (DST): UTC+02:00 (CEST)
- INSEE/Postal code: 60094 /60141
- ^{1} French Land Register data, which excludes lakes, ponds, glaciers > 1 km^{2} (0.386 sq mi or 247 acres) and river estuaries.

Boursonne (French pronunciation: [buʁsɔn]) is a commune in the Oise department in northern France, close to the border with Aisne.

The French playwright and novelist Armand Durantin died in Boursonne on 30 December 1891.

== Population ==
Historical population
Year	Pop.	±% p.a.
1968	224	—
1975	172	−3.70%
1982	192	+1.58%
1990	229	+2.23%
1999	246	+0.80%
2007	271	+1.22%
2012	294	+1.64%
2017	300	+0.40%
2023	303	+0.17%
Source: INSEE

== See also ==
- Communes of the Oise department
