= Jean-Louis-Auguste Commerson =

French writer and playwright (1803–1879)

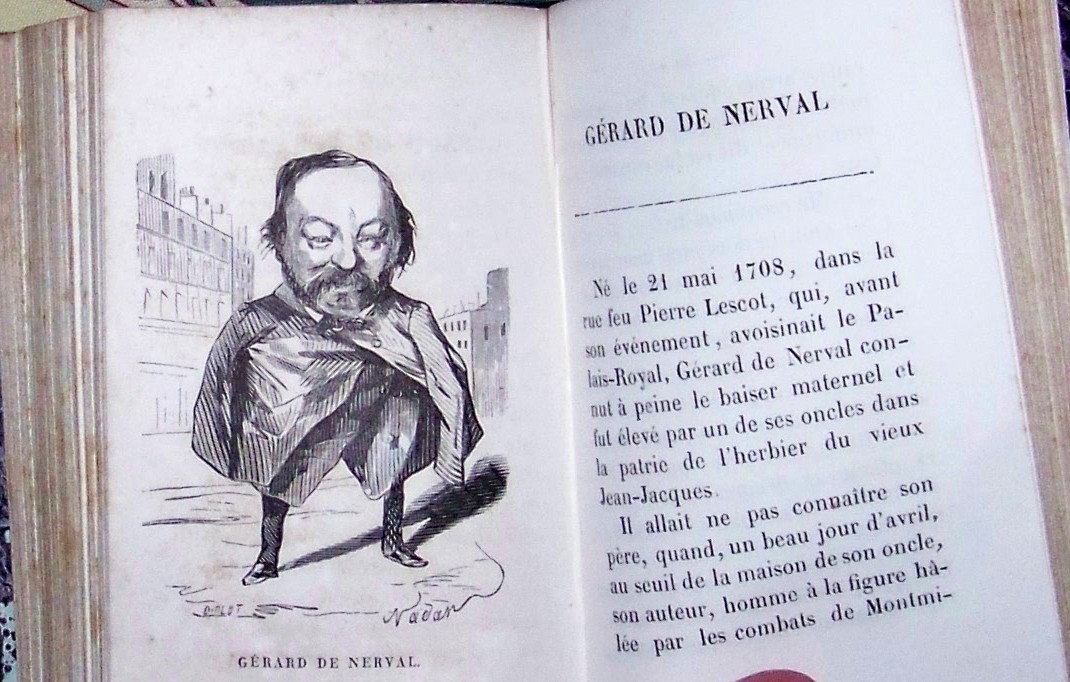
- In Les Binettes contemporaines by Commerson (1854–1855); Gérard de Nerval caricatured by Nadar
- Born: 23 March 1803; Former 6th arrondissement of Paris
- Died: 24 July 1879 (aged 76); 6th arrondissement of Paris
- Occupations: Playwright, journalist, writer

Jean-Louis-Auguste Commerson (2 germinal an XI, 23 March 1803 – 24 July 1879) was a 19th-century French writer, journalist and playwright.

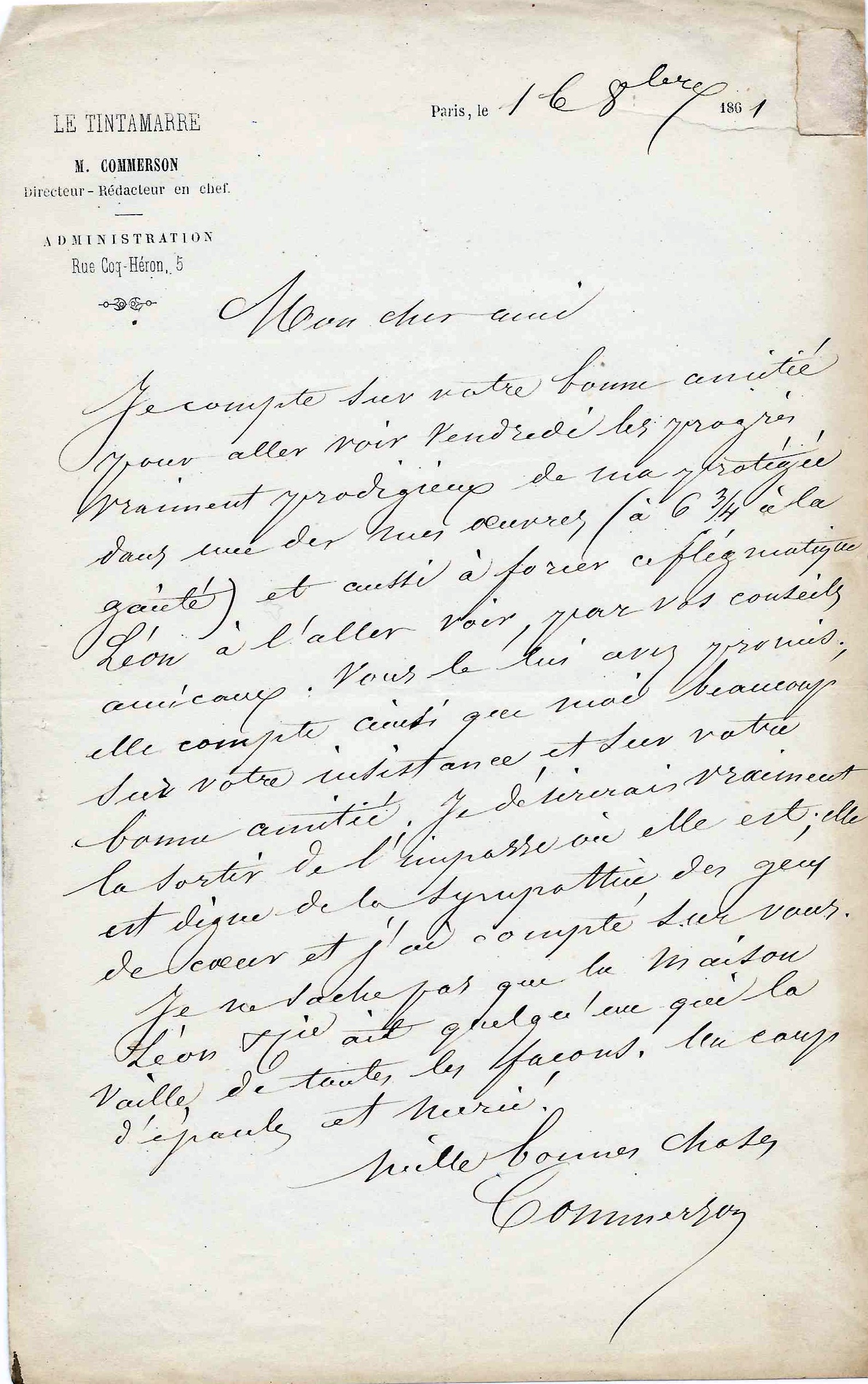
Autograph letter

== Short biography ==
A specialist of puns and journalistic "canards" (false report launched in the media in order to mislead the public), Commerson wrote many humorous books, including Pensées d'un emballeur pour faire suite aux « Maximes » de François de La Rochefoucauld (1851), Un million de bouffonneries (1854), Le Petit Tintamarre (1857), La Petite Encyclopédie bouffonne (1860) and Un million de chiquenaudes et menus propos tirés de la Gazette de Merluchon (1880).

He also authored comédies en vaudevilles, alone or in collaboration, and established the periodical Le Tam-tam.

He signed most of his works of his surname but only occasionally used the pen names Joseph-Prudhomme and Joseph Citrouillard.

== Works ==
=== Theatre ===
- 1840: Les Trente, « drame national » in four acts and in verse
- 1845: Un souper sous la Régence, comédie-vaudeville in one act, with Raymond Deslandes, Théâtre des Délassements-Comiques, 15 November
- 1846: Les Fleurs animées, vaudeville in one act, with Charles Labie and Xavier de Montépin, Théâtre du Vaudeville, 13 July
- 1849: Ma tabatière ou Comment on arrive, comédie-vaudeville in four tableaux, with the Cogniard brothers, Théâtre du Gymnase-Dramatique, 15 March
- 1849: Une bonne fille, vaudeville in one act, Théâtre de la Porte-Saint-Martin, 11 November
- 1849: Les Fredaines de Troussard, vaudeville in one act, with Édouard Brisebarre and Charles Potier, Théâtre des Folies-Dramatiques, 13 November
- 1853: Les Deux Marguerite, vaudeville in one act, with Félix Dutertre de Véteuil, Théâtre des Variétés, 12 July
- 1853: La Pêche aux corsets, vaudeville in one act, with Eugène Furpille, Théâtre de la Gaîté, 22 October
- 1854: Un mari à l'étouffée, vaudeville in one act, with Eugène Chavette, Théâtre des Folies-Dramatiques, 28 January
- 1854: Les Binettes contemporaines, review in three acts and 7 tableaux, with Clairville and J. Cordier, Théâtre du Palais-Royal, 23 December
- 1855: Où sont les pincettes ? folie-vaudeville in one act, with Eugène Chavette, Théâtre des Folies-Dramatiques, 13 June
- 1855: Un suicide à l'encre rouge, vaudeville in one act, with Eugène Furpille, Théâtre de la Gaîté, 10 September
- 1856: Un monsieur bien mis, vaudeville in one act, with Henri Rochefort, Théâtre des Folies-Dramatiques, 10 March
- 1859: Le Jugement de Pâris, operetta in one act mingled with dances and extravaganza, with Ernest Alby, music by Laurent de Rillé, théâtre des Folies-Nouvelles, 11 February
- 1859: La Clarinette mystérieuse, vaudeville in one act, with Jules Moinaux, Théâtre des Folies-Dramatiques, 18 June
- 1860: Quatre femmes sur les bras, vaudeville, with Théodore Labourieu, Théâtre de la Gaîté, 17 March
- 1860: Le Marchand de parapluies, revue in three acts, with Paul Faulquemont, Théâtre Beaumarchais, 17 December
- 1864: La Vengeance de Pistache, vaudeville in one act, with Amable Bapaume, théâtre Déjazet, 26 March
- 1866: Doña Framboisias, folie-vaudeville in one act, with Amable Bapaume, Théâtre des Folies-Marigny, 6 July
- 1867: Les Vacances de Cadichet, vaudeville n one act, with Amable Bapaume, Théâtre des Folies-Dramatiques, 22 July

=== Texts ===
- 1922: Les Plaisirs de la ville, poèmes dédiés aux jolies femmesText online
- 1825: Contes et NouvellesText online
- 1825: Hommage à La FayetteText online
- 1851: Pensées d'un emballeur pour faire suite aux « Maximes » de La Rochefoucauld, foreword by Théodore de BanvilleText online in Bibliothèque des calembours. Reprint : Garnier, 1978.
- 1854: Le Code civil dévoilé, dédié aux emballeurs, aux réfugiés polonais et aux gardes nationaux sans ouvrage et notamment aux licenciés de l'École de droit, pour cause d'incapacité notoire
- 1854: Rêveries d'un étameur, pour faire suite aux pensées de Blaise Pascal
- 1854: Un million de bouffonneries, ou Le Blagorama français
- 1854–1855: Les Binettes contemporaines, par Joseph Citrouillard [Commerson], reviewed by Commerson, to compete with those of Eugène de Mirecourt, portraits by Nadar, 10 vol., 1854–1855 Texte en ligne 1 2 3 4 5
- 1857: Le Petit Tintamarre, humorous weeklyText online
- 1858: Lettre d'un vieux fou à un jeune sageText online
- 1860: Petite encyclopédie bouffonneText online
- c.1880: Un million de chiquenaudes et menus propos tirés de la « Gazette de Merluchon »

=== Newspapers ===
Le Tam-tam, magazine hebdomadaire de littérature, d'arts, de sciences et d'industrie was a newspaper published by Commerson from 1835. It would change titles several times during its publication: Le Tam-tam républicain, organe des clubs (March 1848); Le Tam-tam de 1848 (July 1848).

Jean-Baptiste Dalès called Dalès ainé collaborated with this paper which is sometimes called "former Tam-Tam" to distinguish it from two other publications by Commerson:

- Le Tam-tam, revue critique des Polichinels politiques, financiers, religieux et autres by Napoléon Citrouillard [Commerson], specimen issue 10 March 1871;
- Le Tam-tam..., 1872-1877.

== Quote ==
According to Jacques Rouvière, the sentence "Cities should be built in the country, the air is healthier"", generally attributed to Alphonse Allais, is to be found in the Pensées d'un emballeur by Commerson. In fact, it seems that this joke already was in Le Pamphlet provisoire illustré (1848).
