= Bocage (actor) =

French actor

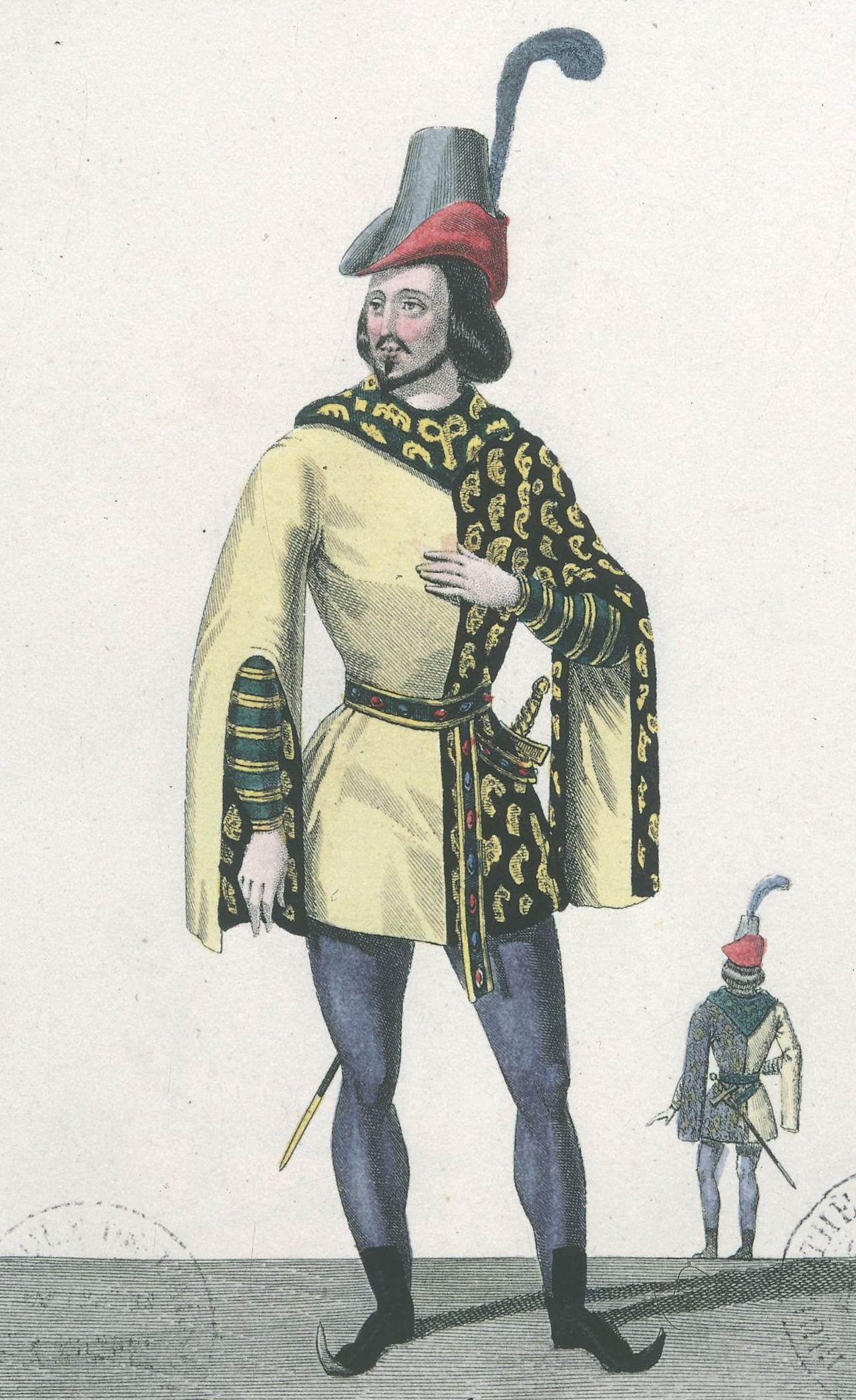
Bocage in the role of Buridan in La Tour de Nesle by Alexandre Dumas (1832).

Pierre-Martinien Tousez, better known by his stage name Bocage, (Rouen, November 11, 1799–Paris, August 30, 1862) was a French actor.

Born into a poor family of laborers, Bocage was, early on, forced to work in a weaving factory in order to earn an income. Having learned how to read and write without going to school, he began to read, from an early age, the works of Shakespeare. He had an opportunity to get on the stage, and he decided to head on to Paris on foot, in order to fulfill his dreams of being an actor. There he entered the Paris Conservatoire, but had to leave it because his financial resources could not afford him the cost of tuition.

Recognized as talented and yet lacking discipline, Bocage's career has a difficult start. He spent several years on obscure provincial stages before joining the cast of the Porte Saint-Martin. In Paris, he was affiliated with various theatres and gained popularity as a major interpreter of romantic dramas: Antony, Marion de Lorme, The Tour de Nesle, Don Juan de Marana, etc.

In the 1830s, Bocage was romantically involved with French writer George Sand.

As a member of the Comédie-Française, Bocage also played the classical repertoire, and he appeared as late as 1819 in La Vieillesse de Richelieu. Bocage also was a member of the Théâtre de l'Odéon, becoming its director in 1845. A politically active citizen, Bocage mingled into the literary movement of his time with a zeal that endowed him with an influence that he tried to put to use during the French Revolution of 1848. He often used his managerial position to have the Odéon's performances serve revolutionary propaganda, and this affected his theatrical career as he was fired from the Odéon in 1848 for anti-government activities.

In 1854 he appeared in Théâtre du Vaudeville in Le Marbrier, by Alexandre Dumas. In 1855, he staged several roles in Paris by Paul Meurice, at the Théâtre de la Porte Saint-Martin. In 1857, he created the role of Admiral Byng in L'Amiral de l’Escadre Bleue by Paul Foucher, at the Cirque Impérial. In 1859 he was appointed manager of the Théâtre Saint-Marcel, where he played in several plays, but the playhouse was too far away to be successful. In 1861, the aging actor went to play for the Théâtre de Belleville, and he managed to show preeminence in his former role as Buridan.

Shortly before his death, Bocage created the role of the old Duke in Les Beaux Messieurs de Bois-Doré at the Théâtre de l’Ambigu-Comique. He also appeared in Jarvis l’honnête homme, Henri Hamelin and Le Marchand de Londres at the Gymnase.

The National Museum of the Château de Compiègne is home to two prints of Bocage by Alphonse-Léon Noël and Benjamin Roubaud. When Bocage's theatrical wardrobe was put up for sale, Virginie Déjazet asked for the dagger that he had used in Alexandre Dumas' Antony, as a most precious souvenir. French writer Paul Bocage was his nephew.

== Sources ==
- Gustave Vapereau, Dictionnaire universel des littératures, Paris, Hachette, 1876, p. 277.
