= Pierre-Chaumont Liadières =

French army officer and playwright (1792–1858)

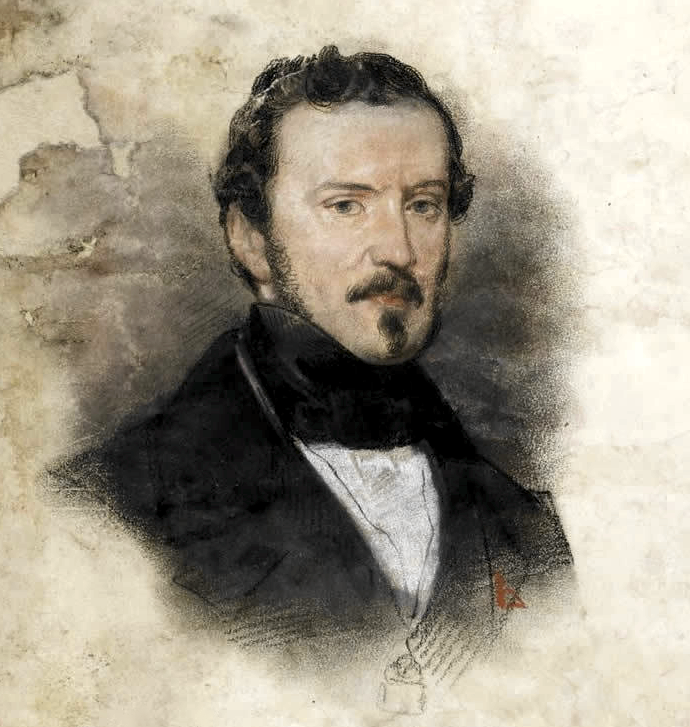
Pierre-Chaumont Liadières

Pierre-Chaumont Liadières (28 September 1792 – 17 August 1858) was a French army officer, politician and playwright.

== Life ==
He was born in Pau and studied in Paris before entering the École polytechnique, from which he graduated in 1812 as an army engineer. He took part in the campaign in the Kingdom of Saxony, assisted at the battle of Leipzig and rose to the rank of lieutenant in 1813 before being captured the following year. During the Hundred Days he served in the armée du Nord and after Napoleon's defeat he remained under constant police surveillance until 1818, when he rejoined the army with the rank of captain of engineers, serving at Bayonne, Grenoble, Saint-Omer and Amiens.

He was part of the garrison of Paris on the outbreak of the 1830 Revolution, fighting on the barricades and being made an ordnance officer by Louis-Philippe. He was well-regarded at court and so was elected deputy for the fifth collège des Basses-Pyrénées (Orthez), replacing Pierre-Firmin Lestapis, who had been dismissed. He was part of the 'Court party' in the lower chamber and was constantly re-elected (on 21 June 1834, 4 November 1837, 2 March 1839, 9 July 1842 and 1 August 1846) right up until the end of Louis-Philippe's reign. He made frequent speeches and was on several committees.

He was made an officer of the Légion d'honneur in 1837, promoted to chef de bataillon du génie in 1841 and made an extraordinary conseiller d'État in 1846. After the French Revolution of 1848 he remained loyal to the July Monarchy and resigned from public life to devote himself to poetry and literature. In 1856 he took part in unsuccessful intrigues to get comte Molé into the Académie française.

== Selected works ==
=== Tragedies ===
- Conradin et Frédéric, 5 acts, published 1820.
- Jane Shore, 5 acts, published 1824 [premiered at the Second Théâtre-français in Paris on 2 April 1824].
- Walsten, 5 acts, inspired by Wallenstein by Schiller, published 1829

=== Comedies ===
- Jean sans-peur, 5 acts, published 1821.
- Les Bâtons flottants, 5 acts, verse [premiered at the Théâtre Français in Paris on 24 June 1851.]

=== History and memoir ===
- Dix mois et dix-huit ans, Paris, 1849
- Souvenirs historiques et parlementaires (1791-1848), Paris, 1855

=== Other ===
- Dioclétien aux Catacombes de Rome, dithyrambic poem on the consolations of religion, awarded a laurel wreath by the Académie d'Amiens at a public sitting on 26 August 1824

== Sources ==
- (in French) « Pierre-Chaumont Liadières », in Robert et Cougny, Dictionnaire des parlementaires français, 1889
