= Honoré Langlé =

French theorist of music

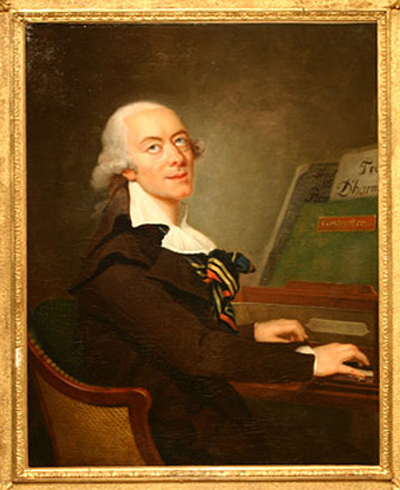
Honoré Langlé

Honoré François Marie Langlé (French pronunciation: [ɔnɔʁe fʁɑ̃swa maʁi lɑ̃ɡle]; 1741–1807) was a French theorist of music of Monegasque origin, composer, and author of a Traité d'harmonie et de modulation (Paris: Boyer, 1795). Napoleon named him to the newly founded Paris Conservatoire.

Born to a family originally from Picardy that was established at Monaco in the 18th century, Langlé showed so much early promise in music that Honoré III of Monaco sent him with an endowment to Naples at the age of fifteen. There he studied harmony and counterpoint at the Conservatorio della Pietà dei Turchini under the direction of Pasquale Cafaro. He remained for more than eight years, composing Masses and motets that gained him a sufficient reputation in Italy that he was appointed to direct the city theatre of Genoa.

In 1768, Langlé left for France. In Paris he supported himself by giving harpsichord and singing lessons and taught musical composition to private pupils, while he gained a reputation through participating in Anne Danican Philidor's Concerts spirituels, the most prominent venue for secular concert music in Paris. There several of his compositions premiered successfully, including a sung monologue, Alcide and a cantata Circé.

In the following decade his reputation spread from the Parisian musical world of Versailles, where as Langlois, the spelling preferred by his son and grandson, he gave clavecin and fortepiano lessons to Queen Marie Antoinette. When the baron de Breteuil formed the École Royale de Chant et de Déclamations in 1784, Langlé was entrusted with teaching singing, a position he retained until the institutional changes that came with the French Revolution. With the creation of the Paris Conservatoire in 1795, Langlé was instituted as librarian, a place he held until 1802.

His theoretical Traité d'harmonie et de modulation was published at Paris in 1795.

His success in the field of opera was less than secure. In 1786 his opera Antiochus et Stratonice failed to please at Versailles. Five years later, during the Revolution, his three-act opera Corisandre, presented at the Académie de musique, sank without a trace. Undeterred, though unable to get them publicly mounted, Langlé continued to compose operas in private for the rest of hid life. His songs achieved more success: his "Hymne à Bara et à Viala" (1794) continued to be taught in music schools through the 19th century.

In retirement towards the end of his life at his property, Villiers le Bel, Langlé devoted himself passionately to gardening. His posthumous reputation has supported François-Joseph Fétis, who found his music lacked qualities of genius, but his Traité d’harmonie et de modulation long remained a staple in academic teaching.
