= Raymond Deslandes =

French journalist and playwright (1825–1890)

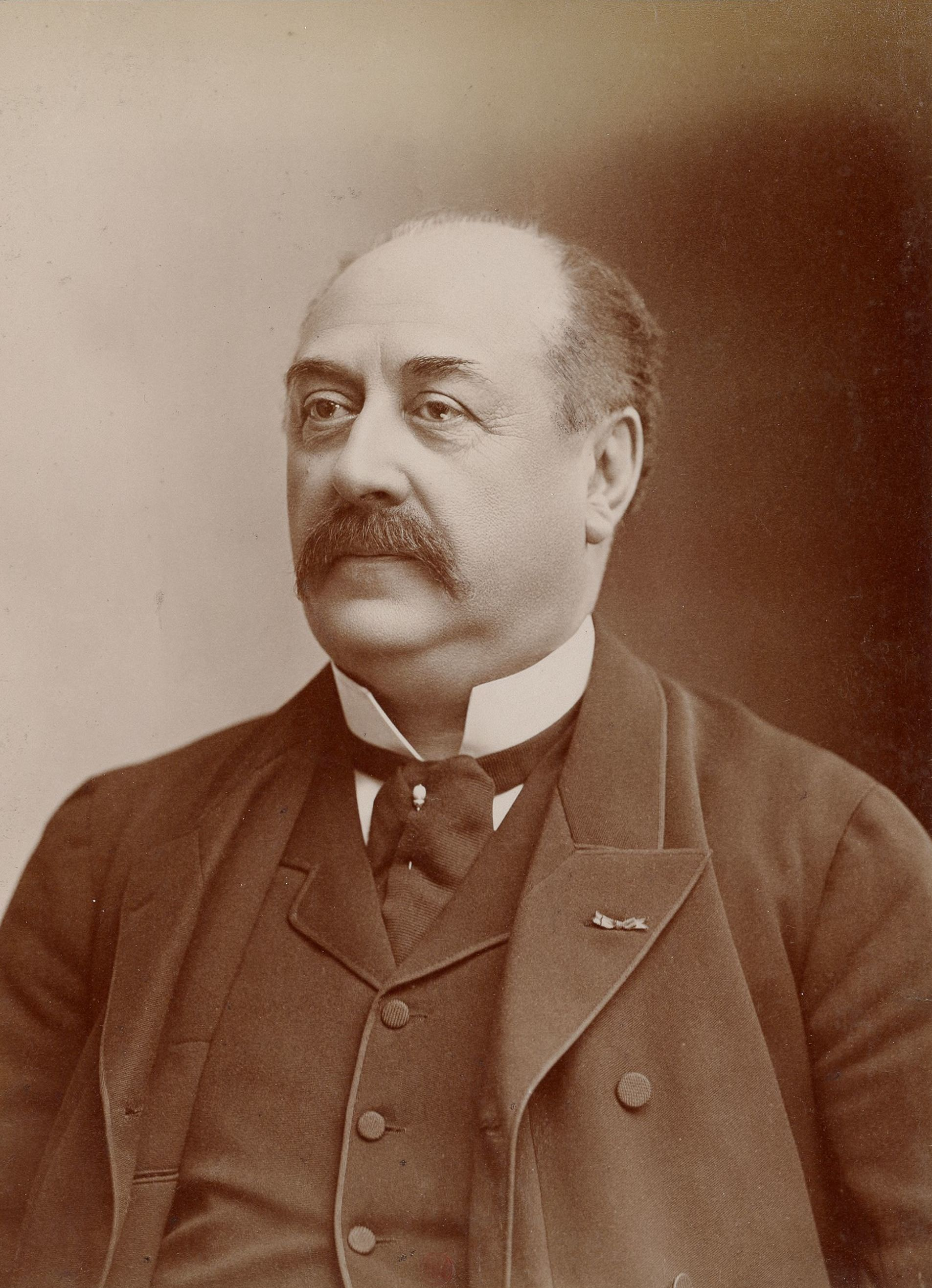
- Born: 12 July 1825; Yvetot
- Died: 23 March 1890 (aged 64); Monte Carlo
- Occupations: Playwright, journalist, theater manager

Raymond Deslandes, called Raimond Deslandes, (12 July 1825 – 23 March 1890) was a 19th-century French journalist, playwright and theater manager.

He wrote, alone or in collaboration (particularly with Eugène Labiche), numerous comedies. He also directed the Théâtre du Vaudeville.

== Works ==
=== Theatre ===
- 1845: Un souper sous la Régence, vaudeville comedy in 1 act, with Commerson, Théâtre des Délassements-Comiques (15 November)
- 1848: Un mariage par procuration, vaudeville comedy in 1 act, with Armand Durantin, Théâtre du Vaudeville (8 June)
- 1850: Les Trois Racan, comedy in 1 act from the Mémoires by Tallemant des Réaux, with Armand Durantin, Théâtre-Historique (25 June)
- 1851: Jeanne, vaudeville comedy in 3 acts, with Auguste Anicet-Bourgeois, Théâtre des Variétés (1 February)
- 1852: Méridien, vaudeville comedy in 1 act, with Clairville and Pol Mercier, Vaudeville (17 August)
- 1853: La Terre promise, vaudeville comedy in 3 acts, with Armand Durantin, Vaudeville (24 January)
- 1853: On dira des bêtises, vaudeville in 1 act, with Eugène Labiche and Alfred Delacour, Variétés (11 February)
- 1853: Le Château des tilleuls, drama in 5 acts, with Adrien Decourcelle and Amédée Rolland, Ambigu-Comique (7 April)
- 1854: D'une fenêtre à l'autre, vaudeville in 1 act, Variétés (1 April)
- 1854: Mariés sans l'être, vaudeville comedy in 1 act, with Édouard Martin, Délassements-Comiques (22 April)
- 1854: Éva, three-act play mingled with song, with Armand Montjoye, Vaudeville (3 November)
- 1855: La Femme d'un grand homme, five-act comedy, with Armand Durantin, Théâtre de l'Odéon (5 February)
- 1856: Madame Bijou, vaudeville comedy in 1 act, with Louis Lurine, Variétés (24 January)
- 1856: L'Amant aux bouquets, comedy in 1 act, with Louis Lurine, Théâtre du Palais-Royal (1 March)
- 1856: Les Femmes peintes par elles-mêmes, comedy in 1 act, with Louis Lurine, Vaudeville (30 May)
- 1856: Le Camp des révoltées, fantaisie in 1n act, with Louis Lurine, Variétés (17 July)
- 1857: Les Comédiennes, comedy in 4 acts, with Louis Lurine, Théâtre du Gymnase (9 May)
- 1859: Un truc de mari, vaudeville in 1 act, with Eugène Moreau, Variétés (13 March)
- 1859: Le Dompteur de femmes, vaudeville in 1 act, with Hippolyte Rimbaut, Palais-Royal (20 October)
- 1859: Monsieur Jules ou le Père terrible, comedy in 2 acts, with Louis Lurine, Variétés (31 October)
- 1860: Une chasse à Saint-Germain, vaudeville in 2 acts, with Eugène Moreau, Variétés (11 September)
- 1860: La Famille de l'horloger, vaudeville comedy in 1 act, with Eugène Labiche, Palais-Royal (29 September)
- 1861: Les Domestiques, three-act comedy, mingled with song, with Eugène Grangé, Variétés (18 June)
- 1862: Les Scrupules de Jolivet, vaudeville in 1 act, Variétés (1 June)
- 1862: Le Marquis Harpagon, comedy in 4 acts, Odéon (1 September)
- 1864: Un mari qui lance sa femme, comedy in 3 acts, with Eugène Labiche, Gymnase (23 April)
- 1864: L'Avocat des dames, vaudeville comedy in 1 act, with Hippolyte Rimbaut, Palais-Royal (18 June)
- 1864: La Jeunesse de Mirabeau, vaudeville in 4 acts, with Aylic Langlé, Vaudeville (11 November)
- 1866: Le Tourbillon, comedy in 5 acts and 6 tableaux, with Michel Carré, Gymnase-Dramatique (8 May)
- 1866: Les Sabots d'Aurore, comedy in 1 act, with William Busnach, Gymnase (21 June)
- 1866: Un gendre, comedy in 4 acts, Vaudeville (25 September)
- 1868: Une journée de Diderot, comedy in 1 act, with Michel Carré, Gymnase (25 June)
- 1868: Les Chambres de bonnes, vaudeville in 3 acts, with Hippolyte Rimbaut, Variétés (13 August)
- 1869: Une fausse joie, comedy in 1 act, with Hippolyte Rimbaut, Variétés (18 February)
- 1871: Le Porte-cigares, comedy in 1, Gymnase (16 September)
- 1872: J. Rosier, 24, rue Mogador, comedy in 1 act, Variétés (8 February)
- 1873: Le Commandant Frochard, comedy in 3 acts, with Hippolyte Rimbaut, Variétés (22 August)
- 1874: Gilberte, comedy in 4 acts, with Edmond Gondinet, Gymnase (19 September)
- 1874: Une fille d'Ève, comedy in 1 act, with Henry Bocage, Vaudeville (24 December)
- 1875: La Filleule du roi, opéra comique in 3 acts, with Eugène Cormon, music by Adolphe Vogel, Fantaisies-Parisiennes in Brussels (10 April); Paris, Théâtre de la Renaissance (23 October)
- 1879: La Perruque, comedy in 1 act, with Alfred Delacour, Palais-Royal (13 September)
- 1885: Antoinette Rigaud, comedy in 3 acts, Comédie-Française (30 September)
- 1889: Belle Maman, with Victorien Sardou, Théâtre du Gymnase (18 March)

=== Other ===
- 1849: Les Jolies Actrices de Paris, Tresse

== Honours ==
- Chevalier de la Légion d'honneur (13 August 1866 decree).
