= Paul Bocage =

French librettist, novelist and dramatist

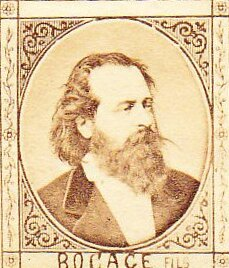
- Born: Paul Auguste Tousez; 5 October 1824
- Died: 25 September 1887 (aged 62)
- Occupations: Librettist, novelist
- Relatives: Bocage (uncle)

Signature
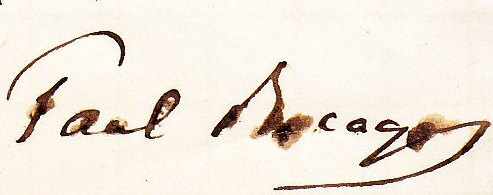

Paul Auguste Tousez, known as Paul Bocage, (5 October 1824, in Paris – 25 September 1887, in Paris) was a French librettist, novelist and dramatist.

Nephew of the famous 19th century actor Bocage (Pierre-Martinien Tousez), he first wrote, using the collective pseudonym "Désiré Hazard" with Octave Feuillet, who had been his classmate at College Louis-le-Grand, the novel Le Grand Vieillard (1845), Échec et mat, a comedy of five acts, played at the Odeon in 1846, Palma, ou la Nuit du vendredi saint, a drama of five acts, played at the Théâtre de la Porte Saint-Martin in 1847, La Vieillesse de Richelieu, a comedy of five acts, played the Comédie-Française in 1849; York, a comedy-vaudeville, played at the Palais-Royal in 1852.

Paul Bocage also wrote, jointly with Joseph Méry, Maître Wolframb, a libretto for the Théâtre Lyrique (1855), and, jointly with Théodore Cogniard, Janot chez les Sauvages, a vaudeville of one act, played at the Théâtre des Variétés.

He also attributes a share in Le Chariot d'enfant, a drama of five acts, by Méry and Gérard de Nerval and Alexandre Dumas's Romulus (1854), Les Mariages du père Olifus (1861) et Les Mille et un fantômes (1849).

Bocage wrote as well novelty items, using the title "Bric-a-Brac", for the magazine Le Mousquetaire. The authorship of Les Mohicans de Paris, a long novel serialized in that publication is also attributed to him. Finally, he published in 1860 les Puritains de Paris and la Duchesse de Mauves (1860, 4 vols. in-8).
