= Touchatout =

French journalist and writer

Léon-Charles Bienvenu
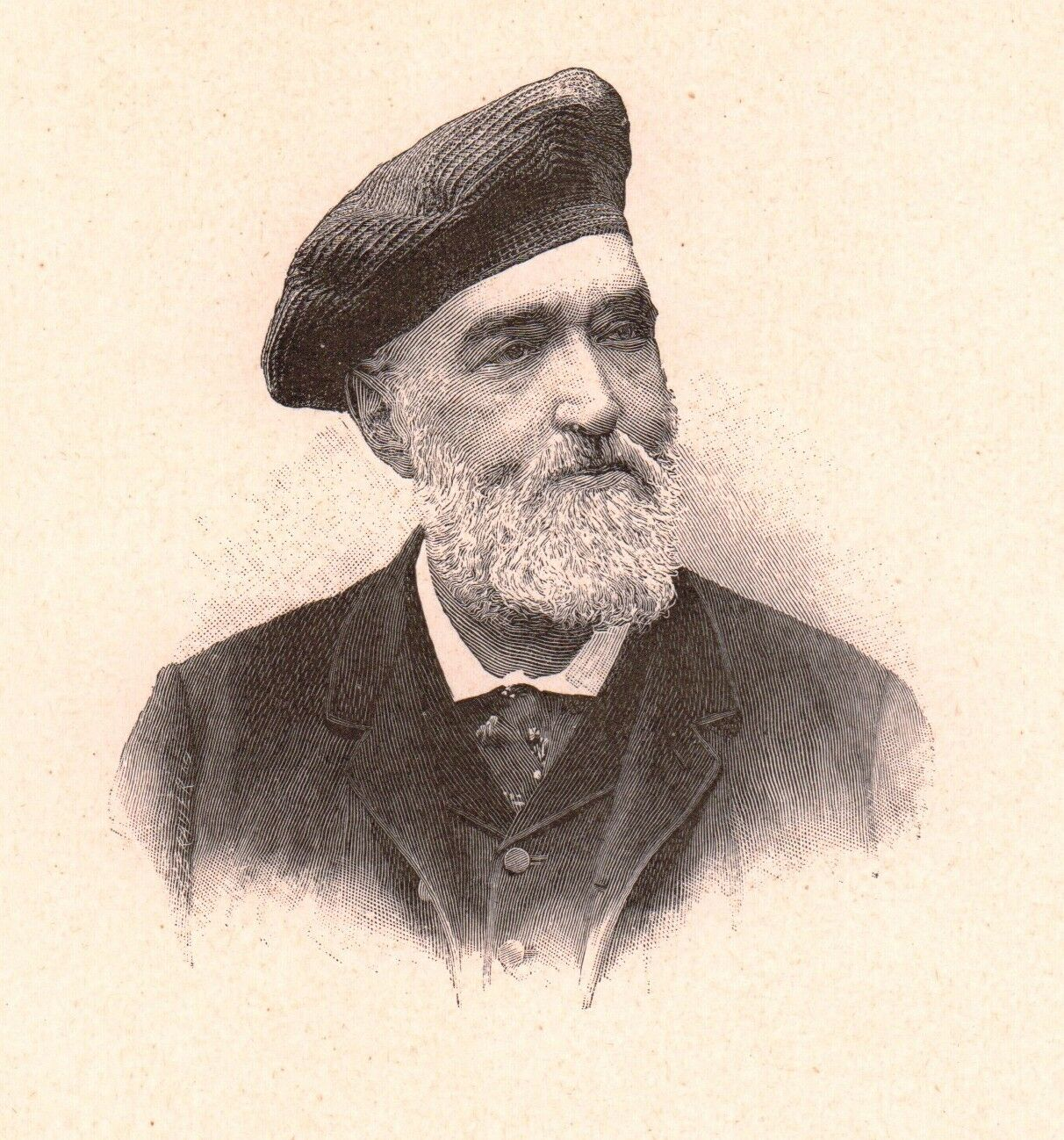
- Touchatout
- Born: 25 March 1835; Paris, France
- Died: January 1911 (aged 85); Paris, France
- Other name: Touchatout (pen name)
- Occupations: journalist and writer
- Known for: satires on political and social life during the Second French Empire

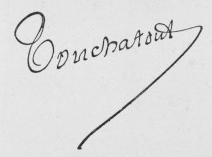
Signature of Touchatout

Léon-Charles Bienvenu (25 March 1835, in Paris – January 1911, in Paris) was a French journalist and writer known for his satires on political and social life during the Second French Empire. He was also known by his pen-name Touchatout.
