= Théâtre du Panthéon =

Theatre in Paris, France

Coordinates: 48.8494°N 2.3446°E

The Théâtre du Panthéon (French pronunciation: [teɑtʁ dy pɑ̃teɔ̃]) was a theatre building in Paris, at 96 (now 46) rue Saint-Jacques (5th arrondissement). It opened in 1832 and closed in 1844. It was named after the nearby Panthéon.

== History ==
It was built in 1831 on the remains of the église Saint-Benoît to designs by Alexandre Bourla and commissioned by Éric Bernard, an actor at the Odéon. It opened on 18 March 1832 with Un panorama, a vaudeville by Thomas Sauvage. Bernard gathered a cast of a dozen actors alongside whom he put on nearly fifty shows in a single year, but such a high turnover took its toll on his health and he passed its management to MM. Georges and Pierre Perrin fils in February 1833. They put on the first appearances of Mademoiselle Judith, which proved promising, but even so the new managers gave up after only two months.

The theatre reopened on 1 September 1835 under the management of Tard, who brought in a totally new troupe of actors. He was so successful that Tard was offered the management of the Odéon in 1836. He was replaced at the Panthéon in September 1836 by the playwright Théodore Nezel, who shifted the theatre's focus towards comedy. In April 1839 Nezel handed the theatre over to one of his troupe, Dubourjal, who took on Aline Duval, who had departed from the théâtre Comte – she was so successful that she was in turn taken on by the manager of the Palais-Royal. After a financial dispute, Dubourjal was dismissed in April 1841 by the theatre's owner.

In September the actor Oscar Pichat was made the theatre's manager, but he resigned in February 1842, to be replaced by its owner Houy, who then managed it until April 1843. Its last two managers, Blachard and Braux, were also actors – they made one final attempt to revive the theatre's fortunes in September 1843, but in vain. On their departure, the government revoked the theatre's licence and closed it permanently. The building was finally demolished in 1854 to build rue des Écoles.

== Selected repertoire ==
- 1832: La Mort du Roi de Rome, one act play by d'Ornoy (26 August)
- 1836: Geneviève ou la Grisette de province, four act play with songs by Léon Halévy and Jaime (5 November)
- 1840: La Guimard, one-act comedy in rhyming couplets by Durantin (16 June)
- 1840: L'Auberge du crime ou les Canards, one-act vaudeville by Durantin and Théophile Deyeux (13 December)
- 1842: Les Amours d'un rat, one-act vaudeville by Durantin and Jules de Rieux (21 février)
