= Édouard Brisebarre =

French playwright

Edouard-Louis-Alexandre Brisebarre (Paris 12 February 1815 – 17 December 1871 10th arrondissement of Paris) was a 19th-century French playwright.

Died aged 56, he was buried in the 71st division of the Père Lachaise Cemetery.

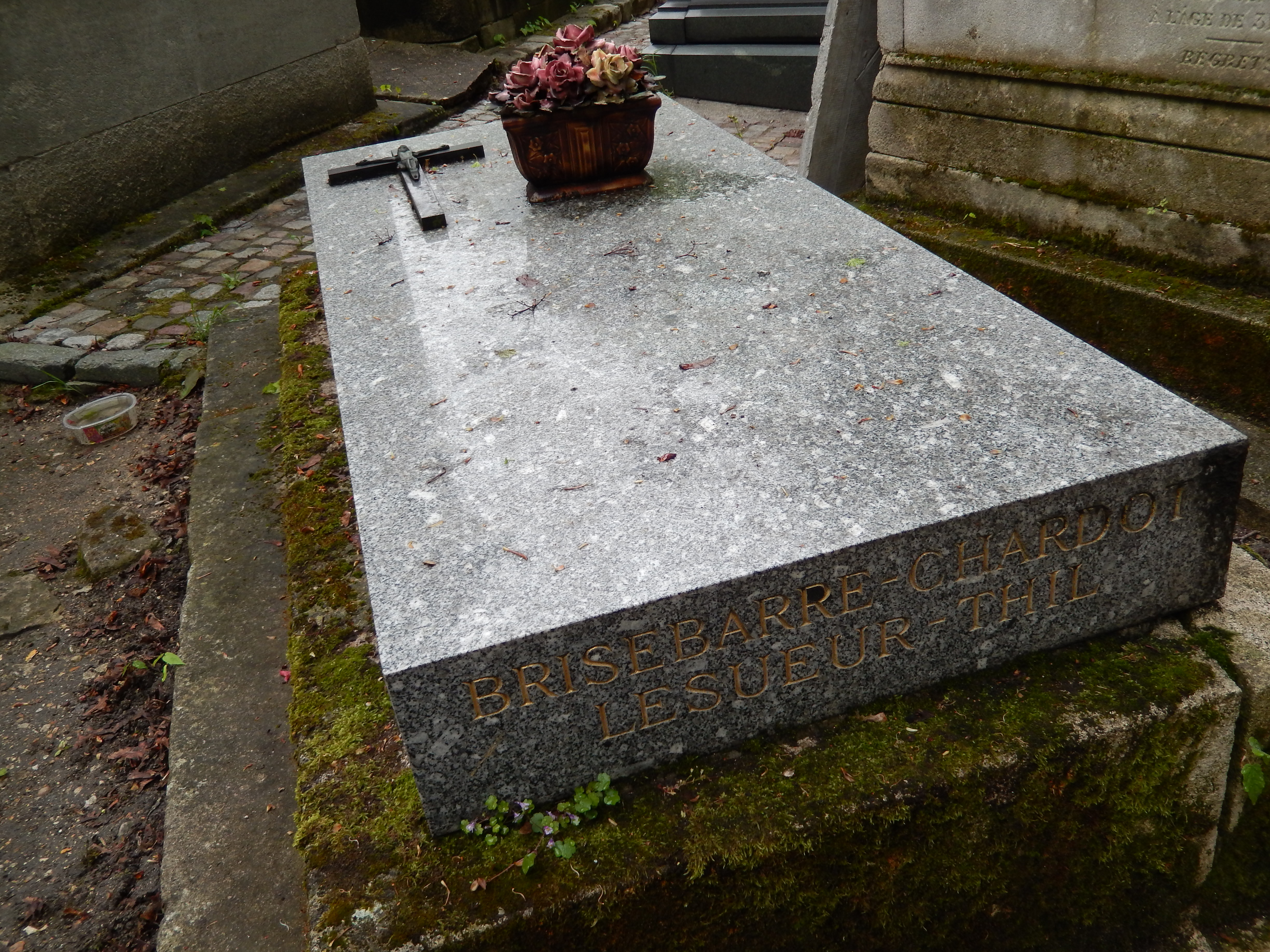
Brisebarre's grave

== Brief biography ==
After he studied at the Lycée Charlemagne, Brisebarre worked as a clerk by a lawyer and obtained the post of tax collector, but was laid off almost immediately and became an actor. He didn't succeed either in that occupation and thus tried his hand at writing: He then immediately was acclaimed by the public with his enigma La fiole de Cagliostro (1835).

Brisebarre composed more than a hundred pieces, mostly in collaboration with other authors: some dramas, but mostly vaudevilles where the situation comedy and words with double meanings often go alongside outright farce.

== Works ==
Plays (selection):

- 1845: La Vie en partie double;
- 1849: Un tigre du Bengale;
- 1851: Drinn-Drinn;
- 1857: Rose Bernard, drama;
- 1859: Les ménages de Paris;
- 1860: Les portiers;
- 1861: Le garçon de ferme, dramea;
- 1861: La Maison Saladier;
- 1862: Monsieur de la Raclée, drama very often given;
- 1863: Léonard;

Comedies:

- 1965: La vache enragée;
- 1867: Les rentiers;
- 1866: Le musicien des rues;
- 1867: Les pauvres filles.

In 1860, Brisebarre published a collection in two volumes under the title: Les Drames de la vie in collaboration with Eugène Nyon.

== Sources ==
"Edouard-Louis-Alexandre Brisebarre". Meyers Konversations-Lexikon. 4. 1888–1890.
