= Joseph-Marie Quérard =

French writer (1797–1865)

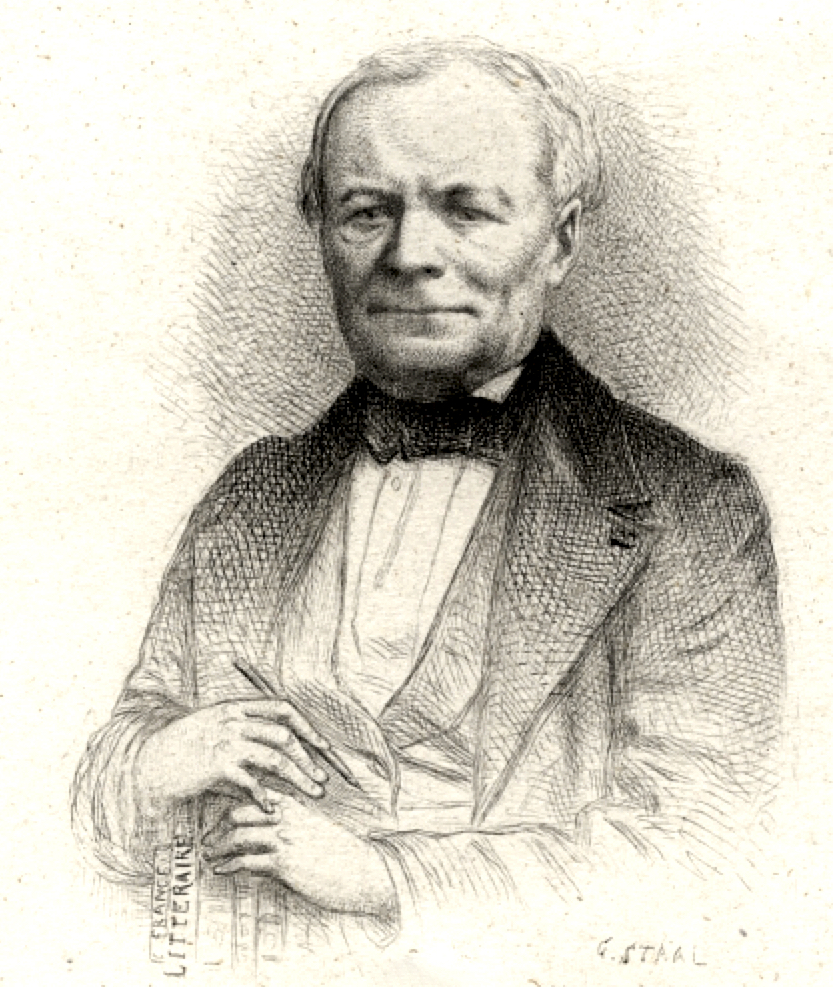
- Joseph-Marie Quérard
- Born: 25 December 1797; Rennes
- Died: 3 December 1865 (aged 67); Paris
- Occupation: Bibliographer

Joseph-Marie Quérard (25 December 1797 – 3 December 1865) was a French bibliographer.

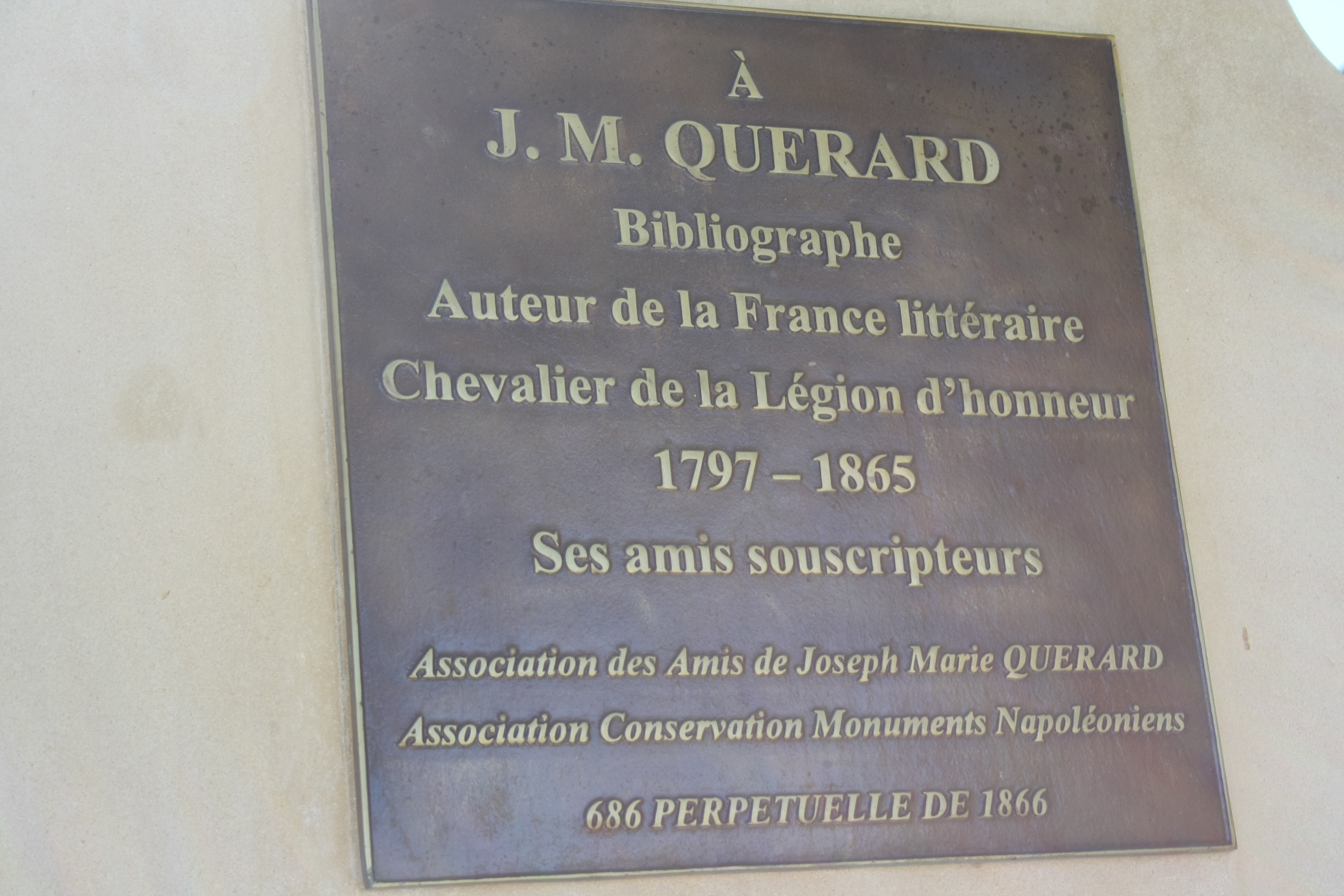
Tombe of Joseph-Marie Quérard in Montparnasse cemetery in Paris

He was born at Rennes, where he was apprenticed to a bookseller. Sent abroad on business, he remained in Vienna from 1819 to 1824, where he drew up the first volumes of his great work, La France littéraire, ou Dictionnaire bibliographique des savants, historiens et gens de lettres de la France (12 vols., 1827–64). This bibliography dealt with the 18th and early 19th centuries, and he was enabled to complete it by a government subsidy granted by Guizot in 1830, and using the assistance of the Russian bibliophile Serge Poltoratzky.

His final volume of contemporary French literature, with which he hoped to complete his work, was cancelled by his publisher, the firm of Didot, without a kill fee. Didot then gave his Littérature française contemporaine to the bibliographers Ch. Louandre and F. Bourquelot. Financially ruined and without an income, Quérard avenged himself by pointing out the errors of his successors. In spite of his claims and the value of the work he had done, Quérard was unable to secure a position in any of the public libraries. He died in Paris.

Among his other works are: Les supercheries littéraires dévoilées (5 vols., 1845–56); Bibliographie La Menaisienne (1849); Dictionnaire des ouvrages-polyonymes et anonymes de la littérature française, 1700–1850 (1846–47).
