= Félix-Auguste Duvert =

French playwright and vaudevillist (1795–1876)

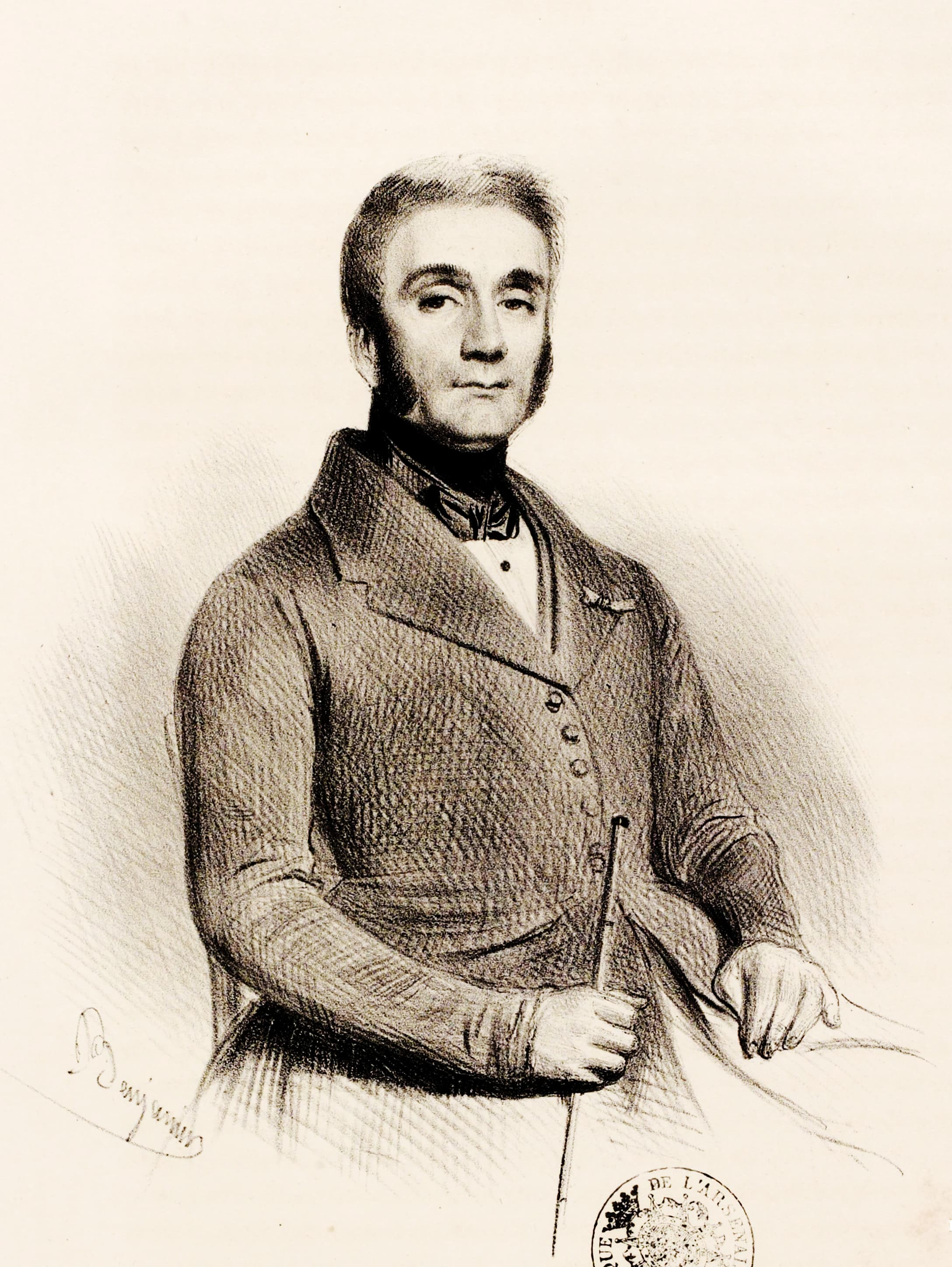
- Born: Félix-Auguste Adolphe Duvert; 12 January 1795; Paris
- Died: 19 October 1876 (aged 81); Paris
- Occupation: Playwright

Félix-Auguste Duvert (12 January 1795 – 19 October 1876) was a 19th-century French playwright and vaudevillist.

== Biography ==
Félix-Auguste Duvert was first a soldier. A volunteer in 1811 among the riflemen of the young guard, he then was part of a regiment of dragoons that he left only after the dismissal of the Armée de la Loire.

In 1823, he made his debut as a playwright at the Théâtre du Gymnase dramatique with Les Frères de lait, a one-act comédie en vaudeville cowritten with Édouard Nicole. He would afterwards collaborate primarily with Paul Duport, Saintine, Étienne Arago, Charles Dupeuty and Charles Varin. But from 1830, his name was inseparably linked to that of his son in law, Augustin de Lauzanne. The latter's share in the development of their works was the backbone of the plot, the outlining of the characters and imagination of the quiproquos. The duo would produce a very great number of successful "follies" for over forty years.

Duvert also wrote the lyrics of many songs. He is buried at Père Lachaise Cemetery (54th division).

== Works ==
=== Theatre ===
- 1823: Les Frères de lait, one-act comédie en vaudeville, with Nicole and Dubay, Gymnase-Dramatique (8 February)
- 1823: Le Mort vivant ou les Suites d'un cartel, one-act comédie en vaudevillewith Nicole, Théâtre du Vaudeville (6 December)
- 1824: Une visite en prison, one-act comédie en vaudeville with Nicole, Vaudeville (24 July)
- 1824: Le Jour des noces ou la Lettre initiale, one-act comédie en vaudeville with Nicole, Vaudeville (14 October)
- 1824: Le Dernier des Romains, prologue, Vaudeville (4 November)
- 1824: Les Habits d'emprunt, one-act vaudeville with Nicole, Vaudeville (4 November)
- 1824: Ma femme se marie, one-act vaudeville with Vianadt, Vaudeville (11 December)
- 1825: Kettly ou le Retour en Suisse one-act vaudeville with Paulin, Vaudeville (28 January)
- 1825: L'Homme de confiance, one-act vaudeville with Bernard, Vaudeville (13 June)
- 1825: La Comédie à la campagne, two-act opéra comique after L'impresario in angustie (1786) by Cimarosa, Théâtre de l'Odéon (16 August)
- 1825: La Dernière Heure de liberté, one-act comédie en vaudeville, with Paulin, Théâtre de Madame (20 August)
- 1826: Joseph II ou l'Inconnu au cabaret, comédie en vaudeville, with W. Lafontaine and Leroy, Vaudeville (25 February)
- 1826: La Sourde-muette ou la Dame au voile vert, one-act comédie en vaudeville with Xavier, Vaudeville (20 April)
- 1826: Oréno ou le Bon Nègre, one-act vaudeville, with Xavier and Paulin, Vaudeville (7 June)
- 1827: Odéina ou la Canadienne, one-act comédie en vaudeville with Xavier, Vaudeville (1 February)
- 1827: Le Jeune Maire, two-act comédie en vaudeville, with Xavier and Dupeuty, Théâtre de Madame (21 May)
- 1827: L'Eau de jouvence, one-act opéra comique imitated from the German, with Xavier, Odéon (13 October)
- 1828: Les Enfans trouvés, two-act comédie en vaudeville, with Xavier and Dupeuty, Vaudeville (30 January)
- 1828: Le Page de Woodstock, one-act comédie en vaudeville, with Xavier and Dupeuty, Vaudeville (8 March)
- 1828: M. Rossignol ou le Prétendu de province, one-act folie-vaudeville, with de Tully and W.Lafontaine, Théâtre des Variétés (21 April)
- 1828: La Matinée aux contre-temps, one-act comédie en vaudeville, with Desvergers and Victor, Théâtre des Nouveautés (16 July)
- 1828: Dix ans de constance, one-act comédie en vaudeville, with Xavier, Nouveautés (11 August)
- 1828: La Saint-Valentin ou le Collier de perles, comédie-vaudeville en un acte with Paulin, théâtre de Madame (3 October)
- 1829: La Couturière, three-act comedy, mingled with couplets, with Desvergers and Varin, Nouveautés (28 October)
- 1829: Sir Jack ou qui est-ce qui veut se faire pendre ?, histoire burlesque in three episodes, with Desvergers and Varin, Nouveautés (9 June)
- 1830: Harnali ou la Contrainte par cor, parody in five scenes of Hernani, with Lauzanne, Vaudeville (30 March)
- 1830: La Famille de l'apothicaire ou la Petite Prude, one-act vaudeville, with Desvergers and Varin, Vaudeville (12 July)
- 1830: 27, 28 et 29 juillet, tableau épisodique des trois journées with Étienne Arago, Vaudeville (17 August)
- 1830: Bonaparte, lieutenant d'artillerie, ou 1789 et 1800, two-act historical comedy, mingled with couplets, with Xavier and Saint-Laurent, Vaudeville (9 October)
- 1830: La Ligue des femmes, ou le Bal et la Faction, « tableau civil et militaire » in one act, with Xavier, Vaudeville (4 December)
- 1830: Cagotisme et Liberté, ou les Deux Semestres, revue in two parts, with Ernest and Étienne, Vaudeville (31 December)
- 1831: Heur et Malheur, vaudeville, with Basset and Lauzanne, Vaudeville (19 April)
- 1831: M. Chapolard ou le Lovelace dans un grand embarras, one-act comédie en vaudeville, with Lauzanne and Paulin, Variétés (25 June)
- 1831: La Famille improvisée, « scènes épisodiques », with Dupeuty and Brazier, Vaudeville (5 July)
- 1831: Marionnette, parody in 5 acts and in verse of Marion Delorme, with de Dupeuty, Vaudeville (29 August)
- 1831: Le Fils du colonel, one-act drama, mingled with couplets, with Henry, Vaudeville (31 October)
- 1832: Mademoiselle Marguerite, one-act vaudeville, with Xavier, Vaudeville (2 February)
- 1832: Perruque et Chandelles, one-act vaudeville, with Lauzanne, Vaudeville (26 April)
- 1832: La Moustache de Jean-Bart, one-act vaudeville-anecdote, with Desvergers and Vanderburch, Théâtre du Palais-Royal (15 August)
- 1832: Le Marchand de peaux de lapin ou le Rêve, « invraisemblance » in 3 parts, with Lauzanne, Variétés (16 October)
- 1832: Les Cabinets particuliers, one-act folie-vaudeville, with Xavier, Vaudeville (23 October)
- 1833: Le Singe et l'Adjoint, one-act folie-vaudeville, with Henry, Palais-Royal (7 February)
- 1833: Prosper et Vincent, two-act vaudeville, with Lauzanne, Variétés (7 November)
- 1834: Un scandale, one-act folie-vaudeville, with Lauzanne, Palais-Royal (18 January)
- 1834: Le Huron ou les Trois Merlettes, one-act folie philosophique, with Xavier and Lauzanne after Voltaire, Variétés (4 February)
- 1834: Pécherel l'empailleur, one-act vaudeville, with Lauzanne, Vaudeville (28 April)
- 1834: Jacquemin, roi de France, comedy mingled with songs in two acts, with Lauzanne, Vaudeville (8 September)
- 1834: La Filature, three-act comédie en vaudeville, with Lauzanne, Palais-Royal (28 October)
- 1834: La Vie de Napoléon racontée dans une fête de village, scène épisodique, with Tousez, Palais-Royal (9 November)
- 1835: Cornaro, tyran pas doux, translation in four acts and in verse of 'Angelo, Tyrant of Padua with Dupeuty, Vaudeville (18 May)
- 1835: Le Jugement de Salomon, one-act vaudeville, with Lauzanne, Variétés (3 November)
- 1836: Elle n'est plus ! (sequel of Simple histoire), one-act comédie en vaudeville, with Lauzanne, Théâtre de la Gaîté (22 January)
- 1836: Le Hottentot, three-part folie-vaudeville, with Lauzanne, Théâtre de la Porte-Saint-Antoine (2 February)
- 1836: Monsieur et Madame Galochard, one-act vaudeville, with Xavier and Lauzanne, Vaudeville (6 February)
- 1836: La Fille de la favorite, three-act historical comedy, with Lauzanne, Théâtre de la Porte-Saint-Martin (11 February)
- 1836: Actéon et le Centaure Chiron, farce, with Théaulon and de Leuven, Palais-Royal (19 March)
- 1836: Renaudin de Caen, ctwo-act comédie en vaudeville, with Lauzanne imitated from Calderón, Vaudeville (24 March)
- 1836: Capitaine de voleurs, two-act comédie en vaudeville, with Xavier and Lauzanne, Vaudeville (14 November)
- 1836: Le Mari de la dame de chœurs, two-act vaudeville, with Bayard, Vaudeville (12 December)
- 1837: La Laitière et les Deux Chasseurs, ou l'Ours, le Ballon, la Grenouille et le Pot au lait, « chose fort ancienne, imitée de défunt Duni et de ci-devant Anseaume », with Xavier and Lauzanne, Palais-Royal (6 February)
- 1837: Michel, ou Amour et Menuiserie, four-act comédie en vaudeville, with Lauzanne and Jaime, Variétés (16 February)
- 1837: Paul et Pauline, two-act comédie en vaudeville, with Lauzanne, Palais-Royal (5 June)
- 1837: Mina ou la Fille du bourgmestre, two-act comédie en vaudeville, with Lauzanne, Vaudeville (4 July)
- 1838: Bijou ou l'Enfant de Paris, four-act féerie mingled with comédie en vaudevilles, with Pixérécourt and Brazier, Cirque-Olympique (31 January)
- 1838: Impressions de voyage, two-act vaudeville, with Xavier and Lauzanne, Vaudeville (13 June)
- 1838: Les Étrennes de ma barbe, à-propos vaudeville in one act, with Lauzanne, Palais-Royal (31 December)
- 1839: La Femme de ménage, one-act folie, with Xavier and Lauzanne, Palais-Royal (7 March)
- 1839: Le Plastron, two-act comedy mingled with spong, with Xavier and Lauzanne, Vaudeville (27 April)
- 1841: Un monsieur et une dame, comédie en vaudeville, with Xavier and Lauzanne, Vaudeville (27 February)
- 1841: La Sœur de Jocrisse, one-act vaudeville, with Varner, Palais-Royal (17 July)
- 1841: Un monstre de femme, one-act comédie en vaudeville, with Varner and Lauzanne, Vaudeville (10 September)
- 1842: Le Grand Palatin, three-act comédie en vaudeville, with Lauzanne and Le Roux, Vaudeville (22 January)
- 1842: Carabins et carabines, two-act vaudeville, with Xavier and Lauzanne, Variétés (23 April 1842)
- 1842: L'Omelette fantastique, one-act vaudeville, with Boyer, Palais-Royal (22 August 1842)
- 1842: Les Informations conjugales, one-act vaudeville, with Lauzanne and Jaime, Variétés (7 November 1842)
- 1843: Les Égarements d'une canne et d'un parapluie, folie-vaudeville, with Lauzanne, Palais-Royal (28 January)
- 1843: Les Soupers de carnaval, folie mingled with couplets, with Varin and de Kock, Théâtre du Palais-Royal (26 February).
- 1843: Entre ciel et terre, pochade-vaudeville, with Lauzanne, Palais-Royal (25 April)
- 1843: Jocrisse en famille, one-act folie-vaudeville, with Lauzanne, Palais-Royal (28 June)
- 1843: L'Homme blasé, two-act vaudeville, with Lauzanne, Vaudeville (18 November)
- 1844: La Bonbonnière ou Comme les femmes se vengent, one-act vaudeville, with Lauzanne, Palais-Royal (1 February)
- 1844: Trim ou la Maîtresse du roi, two-act vaudeville, with Lauzanne, Variétés (16 March)
- 1845: Le Pot aux roses, one-act comédie en vaudeville, with Boyer, Palais-Royal (31 October)
- 1845: L'Île de Robinson, one-act vaudeville, with Lauzanne, Vaudeville (3 November)
- 1845: Riche d'amour, one-act comédie en vaudeville, with Xavier and Lauzanne, Vaudeville (20 November)
- 1845: Le Marchand de marrons, two-act comédie en vaudeville, with Lauzanne, Gymnase-Dramatique (22 December)
- 1846: Beaugaillard ou le Lion amoureux, one-act vaudeville imitated from a fable by La Fontaine, with Xavier and Lauzanne, Vaudeville (5 February)
- 1846: La Planète à Paris, revue in three acts and 4 tableaux, with J. Gabriel and Dupeuty, Vaudeville (12 December)
- 1847: Le Docteur en herbe, two-act comédie en vaudeville, with Lauzanne, Palais-Royal (1 April)
- 1847: Ce que femme veut..., two-act comédie vaudeville, with Lauzanne, Vaudeville (14 April)
- 1848: La Clef dans le dos, one-act comédie en vaudeville, with Lauzanne and Duport, Gymnase-Dramatique (12 February)
- 1848: Hercule Belhomme, one-act comédie en vaudeville, with Lauzanne, Gymnase-Dramatique (30 March)
- 1849: La Poésie des amours et..., two-act comédie en vaudeville, with Lauzanne, Vaudeville (1 March)
- 1849: Un cheveu pour deux têtes, one-act comedy mingled with couplets, with de Varner and Lauzanne, Théâtre Montansier (11 May)
- 1849: Malbranchu, greffier au plumitif, two-act comédie en vaudeville, with Xavier and Lauzanne, Vaudeville (26 November)
- 1849: La Fin d'une république ou Haïti en 1849, à-propos-vaudeville in one act, with Lauzanne, Vaudeville (18 December)
- 1850: À la Bastille, one-act vaudeville, with Xavier and Lauzanne, Variétés (6 May)
- 1850: Le Pont cassé, one-act comédie en vaudeville, with Lauzanne, Variétés (10 October)
- 1850: Supplice de Tantale, one-act comédie-vaudeville, with Lauzanne, Variétés (31 October)
- 1851: Les Malheurs heureux, one-act comédie-vaudeville, with Lauzanne and La Rounat, Variétés (3 May)
- 1852: Une queue rouge, comédie en vaudeville, two acts in 3 parts, with Lauzanne, Variétés (17 January)
- 1852: Le Puits mitoyen, one-act folie-vaudeville, with Lauzanne, Variétés (25 January)
- 1852: Le Roi des drôles, three-act comedy mingled with song, with Lauzanne, music by Nargeot, Variétés (3 August)
- 1853: Une jolie jambe, one-act vaudeville, with Lauzanne, Vaudeville (13 March)
- 1854: Un père de famille, one-act comédie en vaudeville, with Lauzanne, Gymnase-Dramatique (22 February)
- 1855: Le Diable, two-act vaudeville, with Lauzanne, Variétés (12 January)
- 1856: Riche de cœur, one-act comédie en vaudeville, with Lauzanne, Gymnase-Dramatique(26 September)
- 1858: Le Hanneton du Japon, one-act comédie en vaudeville, with Lauzanne, Palais-Royal (27 March)
- 1858: Macaroni d'Italie, one-act vaudeville, with Lauzanne and H. L***, Variétés (12 April)
- 1858: En revenant de Pondichéry, two-act comedy, mingled with couplets, with Lauzanne, Palais-Royal (2 December)
- 1859: Voyage autour de ma chambre, one-act opéra comique, with Xavier and Lauzanne, music by Albert Grisar, Opéra-Comique (12 August)

=== Other ===
- 1830 : Les Havrais, cantate adressée aux habitans du Havre, paroles de Duvert
- 1830 : La Parisienne, chant national d’É. Arago, Duvert et Varin, « au profit des blessés et des familles des citoyens morts en combattant pour la liberté les 27, 28 et 29 juillet »

== Bibliography ==
- Édouard Noël et Edmond Stoullig, « Félix-Auguste Duvert », Les Annales du théâtre et de la musique, year 1876, Paul Ollendorff, Paris, 1877, p. 877, at Gallica.
