= Madame Grassot =

French theatre actress

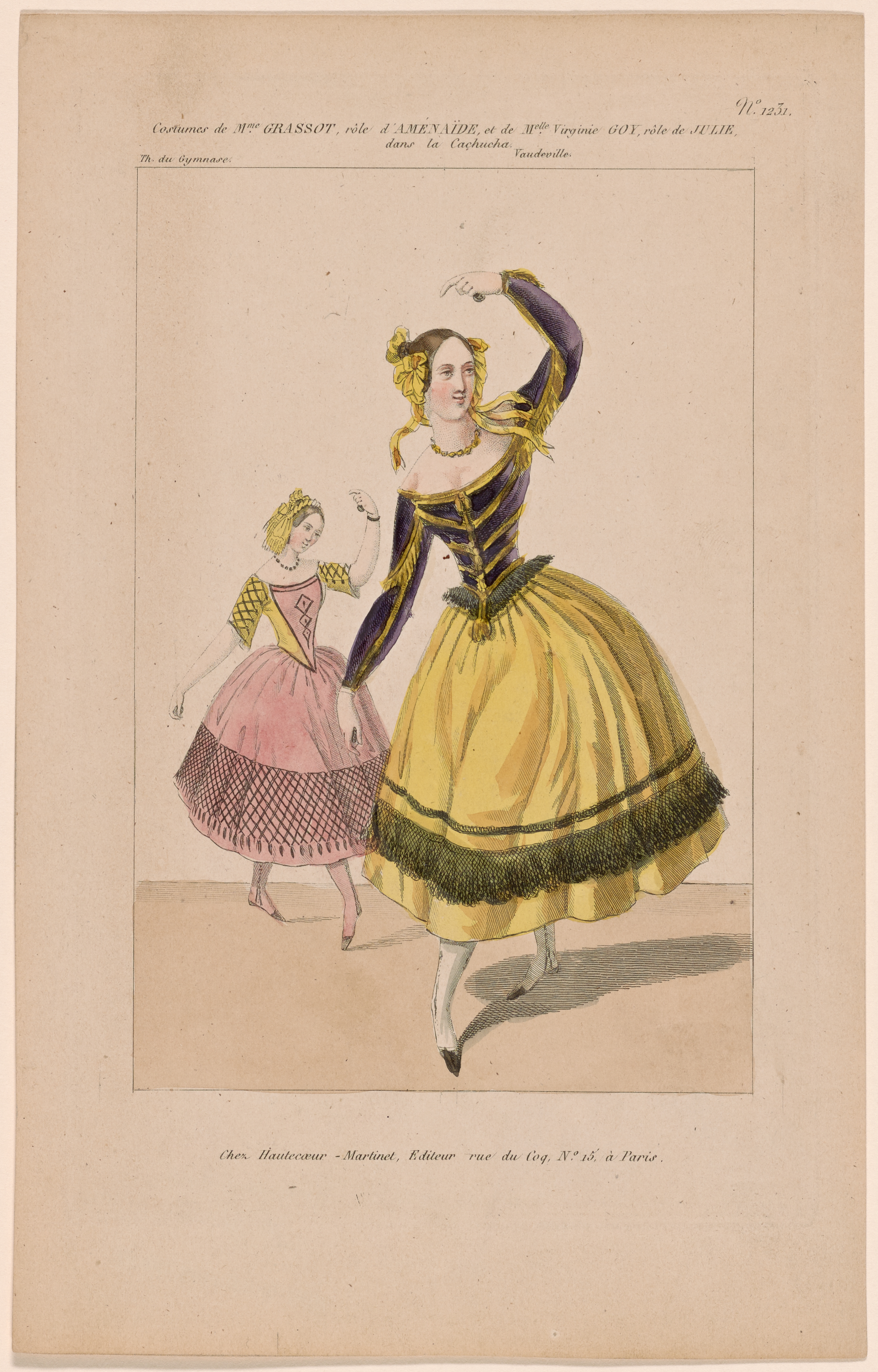
Costumes by Mme. Grassot, role of Aménaïde, and Melle. Virginie Goy, role of Julie, in La Cachucha. Théâtre du Vaudeville Du Gymnase (NYPL b19589333-5179618)

Françoise Billiard, known as Madame/Mme Grassot or Fanny Grassot, was a French theatre actress, born in 1810 (some sources say 1811) and died at the Rossini retirement home, rue Mirabeau in Paris, on 23 June 1892 (some sources say 1893).

She performed in traveling troupes then at the Théâtre du Gymnase from 1833. Also cited at the Palais-Royal. In 1868, aged 57, with thirty years in the theatre, she received a pension of 200 francs by the Society of Artists (Société des Artistes).

She married actor Paul Grassot in Paris on 29 May 1852 (some sources say earlier).

Theatre credits include Clara Soleil by Edmond Gondinet and Pierre Sivrac (1885) and La Cachucha by Desvergers, both at Théâtre du Vaudeville, and many more.

== Theatre credits ==
Selected credits listed below.

1892	The Pont-Biquet Family by Alexandre Bisson
1885	Clara Soleil by Edmond Gondinet
1882	A Wedding Paris by Edmond About
1853	A Woman in my Fountain by Théodore Barrière
1848	Agénor the Dangerous by Eugène Labiche
"	An English Channel by Eugène Labiche
1846	Mademoiselle My Wife by Auguste Lefranc
1845	The Almanac of 25,000 Addresses by Ferdinand de Villeneuve
1842	The Fantastic Omelette by Louis Boyer
1840	Trianon by Jean-François Bayard
"	Bob by Paul Duport
"	Day to Fans by Emmanuel Théaulon
1839	Gabrielle by Jacques-François Ancelot
1838	The Grand Daddy Guerin by Laurencin
"	La Cachucha by de Desvergers
"	Paul Duport's Sister-in-Law
1835	Be Loved or Die! by Eugène Scribe
1834	Pécherel the Empailleur by Félix-Auguste Duvert
"	Salvoisy by Eugène Scribe
1833	It is Still the Happiness by Lockroy
"	A Mother by Jean-François Bayard
1821	The Little Sister by Eugène Scribe
