= Antoine-François Varner =

French vaudevillist (1789–1854)

- Born: 23 April 1789; Paris, France
- Died: 5 September 1854 (aged 65); Paris, France
- Education: Collège Sainte-Barbe, Paris
- Occupation: vaudevillist
- Years active: 1817–1852
- Known for: composed comédies en vaudeville
- Awards: Chevalier of the Légion d'honneur

Antoine-François Varner (23 April 1789, in Paris – 5 September 1854, in 3rd arrondissement of Paris) was a 19th-century French vaudevillist.

== Short biography ==
After he finished his studies at Collège Sainte-Barbe in Paris, Varner served for a while in the dragoons. He then joined the army and took part to the French invasion of Russia as deputy commissioner of war.

Unemployed under the Bourbon Restoration, he devoted himself to literature and composed comédies en vaudeville, either alone or in collaboration with Scribe, Ymbert, Bayard, Mélesville, Dupin, Delestre-Poirson, Dartois, Le Roux, Brazier, Duvert, Lauzanne, Deslandes and Prémaray.

After 1830, Varner obtained a position as chief clerk at the Prefecture of the Seine, a position that he lost after the French Revolution of 1848.

== Works ==
- 1817: Le Solliciteur, ou l'Art d'obtenir des places, one-act comedy mingled with vaudevilles (Eugène Scribe, Dupin, Varner, Ymbert, Delestre-Poirson), Théâtre des Variétés
- 1817: Les Comices d'Athènes, ou les Femmes orateurs, one-act comédie en vaudeville, translated from Greek Aristophanes (Eugène Scribe, Varner), Théâtre du Vaudeville
- 1818: L'Obligeant, ou la Fureur d'être utile, one-act comedy mingled with vaudevilles (Ymbert, Varner), Théâtre des Variétés
- 1819: Les Deux maris, one-act comedy mingled with vaudevilles (Eugène Scribe, Varner), Théâtre des Variétés
- 1820: Trottin, ou le Retour du sérail, one-act folie-vaudeville (Ymbert, Varner), Théâtre de la Porte-Saint-Martin
- 1820: Le Dîner de garçons, one-act comedy mingled with couplets (Ymbert, Varner), Théâtre des Variétés
- 1820: Le Propriétaire sans propriété, one-act comédie en vaudeville (Ymbert, Varner), Théâtre de la Porte Saint-Martin
- 1822: La Marchande de coco, ou les Projets de réforme, one-act folie grivoise mingled with couplets (Ymbert, Varner), Théâtre des Variétés
- 1823: Le Faubourien, ou le Philibert de la rue Mouffetard, one-act comédie grivoise mingled with couplets (Ymbert, Varner), Théâtre des Variétés
- 1823: Le Précepteur dans l'embarras, one-act comédie-vaudeville (Ymbert, Varner), Théâtre du Gymnase, 3 July
- 1823: La Pièce nouvelle, ou les Assureurs dramatiques, comedy in 1 act and in vers (Varner), Théâtre du Gymnase
- 1823: L'Intérieur d'un bureau, ou la Chanson, one-act comédie en vaudeville (Scribe, Imbert, Varner), Théâtre du Gymnase dramatique
- 1823: Monsieur Barbe bleue, ou le Cabinet mystérieux, one-act folie mingled with couplets (Dupin, Varner), Théâtre des Variétés
- 1824: La Léocadie de Pantin, parody of la Léocadie by Feydeau (Dartois, Dupin, Varner), Théâtre des Variétés
- 1824: La Mansarde des artistes, one-act comédie en vaudeville (Scribe, Dupin, Varner), Théâtre du Gymnase-Dramatique
- 1824: Le Château de la poularde, one-act comédie en vaudeville (Scribe, Dupin, Varner), Théâtre de Madame
- 1825: Le Plus beau jour de la vie, two-act comédie en vaudeville (Scribe, Varner), Théâtre de Madame
- 1825: La Ville neutre, ou le Bourgmestre de Neustadt, one-act comédie en vaudeville (Ymbert, Varner), Théâtre de Madame
- 1825: Le Plus beau jour de la vie, two-act comédie en vaudeville (Scribe, Varner), Théâtre de Madame
- 1826: La Charge à payer, ou la Mère intrigante, one-act comédie en vaudeville (Varner, Scribe), Théâtre de Madame
- 1826: Le Mariage de raison, two-act comédie en vaudeville (Scribe, Varner), Théâtre de Madame
- 1826: Les Manteaux, two-act comédie en vaudeville (Scribe, Varner, Dupin), Théâtre de Madame
- 1827: Une soirée à la mode, one-act comédie en vaudeville (Varner, Jean-François Bayard, Le Roux), Théâtre de Madame
- 1827: Les Petits appartements, one-act opéra comique (Dupin, Varner, music by Berton), Opéra Comique
- 1828: Les Moralistes, one-act comédie en vaudeville (Scribe, Varner), Théâtre de Madame
- 1828: Le Bourgeois de Paris, ou la Partie de plaisir, play in 3 acts and 5 tableaux (Dartois, Warner, Dupin), Théâtre des Nouveautés
- 1829: Marino Faliero à Paris, folie à propos-vaudeville in 1 act (Varner, [Bayard), Théâtre du Vaudeville
- 1829: Madame de Sainte-Agnès, one-act comédie en vaudeville (Scribe, Varner), Théâtre de Madame
- 1829: Théobald, ou le Retour de Russie, one-act comédie-vaudeville (Scribe, Varner), Théâtre de Madame
- 1829: La Veste et la livrée, one-act comédie en vaudeville (Mélesville, Varner), Théâtre des Variétés
- 1829: La Cour d'assises, tableau-vaudeville in 1 act (Scribe, Varner), Théâtre de Madame
- 1830: La Convalescente, one-act comédie en vaudeville (Mélesville, Varner), Théâtre du Vaudeville
- 1831: Les Deux novices, comédie en vaudeville in 3 periods (Varner, Bayard), Théâtre du Palais-Royal
- 1831: L'Art de payer ses dettes, one-act comédie en vaudeville, (Mélesville, Varner), Théâtre du Vaudeville
- 1831: Le Salon de 1831, à-propos in 1 act mingled with couplets (Brazier, Varner, Bayard), Théâtre du Palais-Royal
- 1832: La Grande aventure, one-act comédie en vaudeville (Scribe, Varner), Théâtre du Gymnase-Dramatique
- 1832: Toujours, ou l'Avenir d'un fils, two-act comédie en vaudeville (Scribe, Varner), Théâtre du Gymnase-Dramatique
- 1832: Paris malade, revue ingled with couplets, (Bayard, Varner), Théâtre du Palais-Royal
- 1833: La Chipie, one-act comédie en vaudeville (Bayard, Varner), Théâtre du Palais-Royal
- 1834: Un ménage d'ouvrier, one-act comédie en vaudeville en 1 acte (Bayard, Varner), Théâtre du Palais-Royal
- 1834: Le Mari d'une muse, one-act comédie en vaudeville (Bayard, Varner), Théâtre du Gymnase-Dramatique
- 1835: La Pensionnaire mariée, one-act comédie en vaudeville, imitated from a novel by Mme de Flahaut (Scribe, Varner), Théâtre du Gymnase-Dramatique
- 1836: L'Oiseau bleu, three-act play mingled with song (Bayard, Varner), Théâtre du Palais-Royal
- 1837: Ma maison du Pec, one-act vaudeville (Mélesville, Varner), Paris, Théâtre du Palais-Royal
- 1837: Le Bout de l'an, ou les Deux cérémonies, one-act comédie en vaudeville (Varner, Scribe), Théâtre du Palais royal
- 1837: César, ou le Chien du château, two-act comédie en vaudeville (Scribe, Varner), Théâtre du Gymnase-Dramatique
- 1838: Le Pioupiou, ou la Gloire et l'amour, two-act comedy mingled with couplets, Théâtre du Palais-Royal. The neologism "pioupiou" to refer to an inexperienced young conscript was created in this play by Varner.
- 1838: C'est Monsieur qui paie, one-act vaudeville (Bayard, Varner)
- 1838: Les Deux maris, ou M. Rigaud, one-act comedy mingled with vaudevilles (Scribe, Varner)
- 1838: Françoise et Francesca, two-act comedy mingled with couplets, Théâtre du Palais-Royal
- 1839: Chantre et choriste, one-act vaudeville, Théâtre du Palais-Royal
- 1839: Le Cousin du ministre, one-act comedy mingled with couplets, Théâtre du Palais-Royal
- 1841: Un monstre de femme, one-act comédie en vaudeville (Varner, Duvert, Lauzanne), Théâtre du Vaudeville
- 1841: Les Pénitents blancs, two-act comedy mingled with song, Théâtre du Palais-Royal
- 1841: La Sœur de Jocrisse, one-act comedy mingled with song (Varner, Duvert), Théâtre du Palais-Royal
- 1842: La Chasse aux vautours, one-act comedy mingled with couplets, Théâtre du Palais-Royal
- 1843: L'Autre part du diable, ou le Talisman du mari, one-act comedy mingled with, Théâtre du Palais-Royal
- 1843: Recette contre l'embonpoint, two-act play mingled with couplets, Théâtre de la Gaîté
- 1843: Le Noctambule, one-act comédie en vaudeville (Varner, Deslandes), Théâtre du Palais-Royal
- 1843: Les Canuts, two-act comedy mingled with song (Varner, Deslandes), Théâtre du Palais-Royal
- 1845: Jeanne et Jeanneton, two-act comédie en vaudeville (Scribe, Varner), Théâtre du Gymnase-Dramatique
- 1845: La Belle et la Bête, two-act comédie en vaudeville (Bayard, Varner), Théâtre du Gymnase-Dramatique
- 1846: Le Petit-fils, one-act comédie en vaudeville (Bayard, Varner), Théâtre du Gymnase-Dramatique
- 1847: Le Chevalier de Saint-Remy, drama in 5 acts and 6 tableaux (Varner, Prémaray, music by Réancourt), Théâtre de la Gaîté
- 1847: Père et portier, two-act vaudeville (Bayard, Varner), Théâtre du Palais-Royal
- 1848: L'Académicien de Pontoise, two-act comédie en vaudeville (Varner, Varin), Théâtre Montansier
- 1848: Ô amitié !… ou les Trois époques, three-act comédie en vaudeville (Scribe, Varner), Théâtre du Gymnase dramatique
- 1849: La Grosse Caisse, ou les Élections dans un trou, pochade électorale in 2 acts mingled with couplets (Bayard, Varner), Théâtre Montansier
- 1849: Un cheveu pour deux têtes, one-act comedy mingled with couplets (Varner, Duvert, Lauzanne), Théâtre de la Montansier
- 1849: Babet, ou le Diplomate en famille, one-act vaudeville, Théâtre du Gymnase
- 1849: La Conspiration de Mallet, ou Une nuit de l'Empire, five-act historical drama mingled with songs (Bayard, Varner), Théâtre du Vaudeville
- 1850: Le Sous-préfet s'amuse, two-act comédie en vaudeville (Bayard, Varner), Théâtre de la Montansier
- 1850: La Perle des servantes, one-act comedy mingled with couplets, Théâtre de la Montansier
- 1851: Le Vol à la fleur d'orange, two-act comédie en vaudeville (Bayard, Varner), Théâtre de la Montansier
- 1852: Madame Schlick, one-act comédie en vaudeville, Théâtre du Gymnase
- 1852: La Fille d'Hoffmann, one-act drama with couplets (Bayard, Varner), Théâtre du Gymnase
- 1852: Les Échelons du mari, three-act comédie en vaudeville (Bayard, Varner), Théâtre du Gymnase

== Honours ==
- Chevalier of the Légion d'honneur (30 April 1843 decree).
