= Hippolyte Le Roux =

French actor and playwright (1801–1860)

Hippolyte Le Roux (Paris 1 July 1801 – Paris, 1 July 1860) was a 19th-century French actor and playwright.

As an actor, he appeared in le Festin de pierre at the Théâtre-Français (1847) and in La Vieillesse de Richelieu (Fronsac) by Octave Feuillet and Pierre-François Bocage at the Comédie-Française in 1848.

His plays were presented on the most prestigious Parisian stages of the 19th century including the Théâtre des Folies-Dramatiques, Théâtre du Palais-Royal, Théâtre des Variétés, and the Théâtre du Vaudeville.

== Works ==
- 1827: Le Jaloux, comédie en vaudeville in 1 act
- 1827: Une soirée à la mode, comédie-vaudeville in 1 act, with Antoine-François Varner and Jean-François-Alfred Bayard
- 1829: Les Mendiants, vaudeville in 3 tableaux, with Henry Monnier
- 1829: Le Petit Tambour, tableau in 1 act
- 1829: Le Vieux Pensionnaire, comédie-vaudeville in 1 act, with Bayard
- 1829: La Maîtresse, comédie-vaudeville in 2 acts, with Alexis Decomberousse and Merville
- 1831: Les Artisans, ou le Lendemain de la noce, tableau-vaudeville, with Eugène Lebas
- 1833: Le Coucher du soleil, comédie-vaudeville in 1 act, with Mélesville
- 1833: Le Soupçon, comédie-vaudeville in 1 act
- 1834: Une fille à établir, comédie-vaudeville in 2 acts, with Bayard
- 1835: La Famille de la future, comédie-vaudeville in 1 act
- 1837: Trop Heureuse ou Un jeune ménage, comedy in 1 act, with Jacques-François Ancelot
- 1837: Mal noté dans le quartier, tableau populaire in 1 act, with Desvergers and Étienne Arago
- 1838: Une nuit d'attente, scène dramatique, mingled with songs, with Alexandre Pierre Joseph Doche
- 1842: Au croissant d'argent, comédie-vaudeville in 2 acts, with Ferdinand de Villeneuve
- 1842: La Dragonne, comedy in 2 acts, mingled with song, with Dumanoir
- 1842: La Plaine de Grenelle, 1812, drama in 5 acts, with Charles Desnoyer
- 1842: Le Grand-Palatin, comédie-vaudeville in 3 acts, with Félix-Auguste Duvert and Augustin-Théodore de Lauzanne de Vauroussel
- 1844: Les Petites Bonnes de Paris
- 1844: Péché et Pénitence, comédie-vaudeville in 2 acts
- 1844: Le Client, ou les Représailles, comédie-vaudeville in 1 act
- 1847: Une chaise pour deux, vaudeville en 1 act
- 1852: Les Blooméristes, ou la Réforme des jupons, vaudeville in 1 act, with Clairville
- 1856: La Chasse aux écriteaux, vaudeville in 3 acts and 1 prologue, with Théodore Cogniard
- 1857: Le Bras d'Ernest, comédie-vaudeville in 1 act, with Eugène Labiche
- 1860: Sourd comme un pot !, comedy in 1 act, mingled with song.

== Bibliography ==
- Joseph Marie Quérard, La France littéraire ou dictionnaire bibliographique des savants..., vol.5, 1833, p. 211
- Louis Gustave Vapereau, Dictionnaire universel des contemporains, vol.2, 1870, p. 1122
- Pierre Larousse, Grand dictionnaire universel du XIXe siècle, 1873
- Camille Dreyfus, André Berthelot, La Grande encyclopédie: inventaire raisonné des sciences, des lettres et des arts, Vol.22, 1886, p. 76
