= Rose Chéri =

French actress

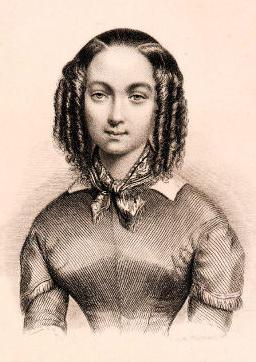
- Born: Rose-Marie Cizos; 27 October 1824; Étampes, Paris
- Died: 22 September 1861 (aged 36); Passy, Paris
- Occupation: Actress
- Spouse: Adolphe Lemoine (m. 1845)
- Relatives: Anna Chéri; Victor Chéri

Rose-Marie Cizos, stage name Rose Chéri, (27 October 1824 – 22 September 1861) was a French actress. She was the elder sister of the actress Anna Chéri (also called Chéri Lesueur) and of the composer and conductor Victor Chéri. After her marriage to Adolphe Lemoine (stage name Montigny, and director of the Théâtre du Gymnase) on 12 May 1845, she took the name Chéri Montigny.

== Roles ==
- Clarisse Harlowe, drama in 3 acts mixed with song of Samuel Richardson, adapted by Dumanoir and Clairville, 5 August 1846.
- La Niaise de Saint-Flour, comedy-vaudeville in one act, by Jean-François Bayard and Gustave Lemoine, Théâtre du Gymnase, 19 June 1848.
