= Charles de La Rounat =

French writer, playwright, journalist and theatre director (1818-1884)

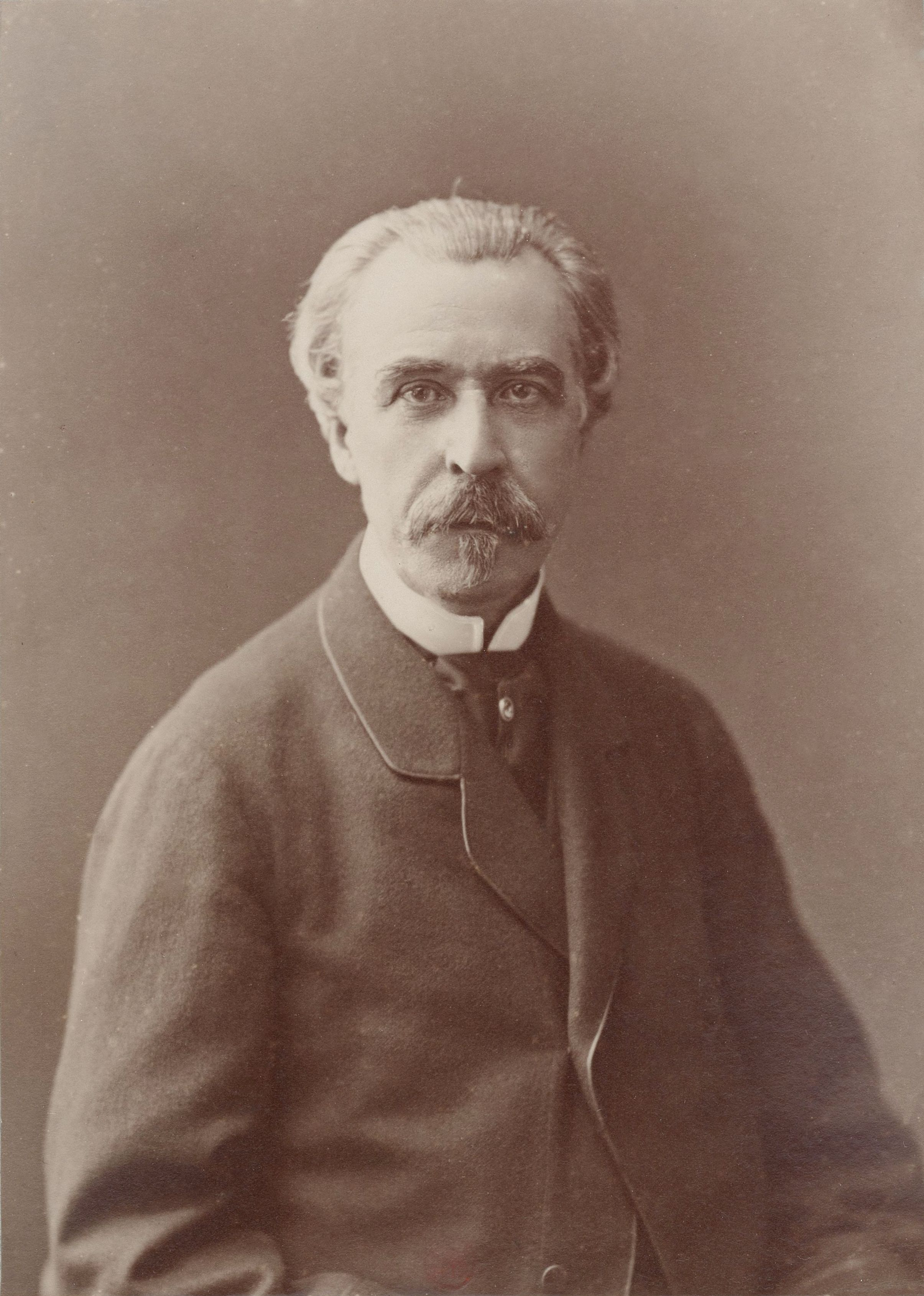
- Charles de La Rounat
- Born: Aimé-Nicolas-Charles Rouvenat; 16 April 1818; Paris, France
- Died: 25 December 1884 (aged 66); Paris, France
- Occupations: Playwright, journalist, writer, theatre director

Charles de La Rounat, real name Aimé-Nicolas-Charles Rouvenat, (16 April 1818 – 25 December 1884) was a 19th-century French writer, playwright, journalist and theatre director.

A director of the Théâtre de l'Odéon from 1856 to 1867, then from 1880 to 1884, he authored several theatre plays and opéra comiques libretti, most of them in collaboration.

The historian Georges Pagès (1867–1939) was his grandson.

== Biography ==
After studying literature, he was appointed in 1848 by the Provisional Government of 1848 secretary of the Luxembourg Commission presided by Louis Blanc, before turning to theatre. In 1855, he started collaborating with La Revue de Paris. After he was appointed director of the Théâtre de l'Odéon the following year, he successfully set up plays by many young authors but eventually resigned in June 1867 over disagreement with the regulators.

He then returned to journalism, wrote the feuilleton of the newspaper Le Siecle and was appointed government commissioner to subsidized theaters.

After he applied in 1879 for the chair of director of the Paris Opera, which ultimately fell to Auguste Vaucorbeil, he became director of the Odeon February 15, 1880, succeeding Félix Duquesnel.

A fall he made the following winter by going to the Department of Fine Arts caused a coxalgy, of which he died three years later, 25 December 1884. Paul Porel succeeded him at the Odéon.

== Plays ==
- 1849: Les Associés, one-act vaudeville with Armand Montjoye, Théâtre des Variétés
- 1850: La Mariée de Poissy, vaudeville with Adolphe d'Ennery, Eugène Grangé, Variétés
- 1851: Les Malheurs heureux, comédie en vaudeville with Félix-Auguste Duvert, Augustin-Théodore de Lauzanne de Vauroussel, Variétés
- 1851: Une bonne qu'on renvoie, one act vaudeville with Samuel-Henri Berthoud, Variétés
- 1853: Pulchriska et Léontino, "pochade" mingled with couplets with Montjoye, Théâtre du Palais-Royal
- 1853: Un homme entre deux airs with Alfred Delacour, Montjoye, Palais-Royal
- 1854: La Pile de Volta, one-act "pochade" in 1 act mingled with couplets with Paul Siraudin, Palais-Royal
- 1855: Une panthère de Java "pochade" with Montjoye, Palais-Royal
- 1856: Les Vainqueurs de Lodi, one-act comedy, Théâtre du Gymnase
- 1856: Pâquerette, one-act opéra comique with Grangé, music by Jules Duprato, Opéra-Comique
- 1871: Marceline, drama in 4 acts, Théâtre du Gymnase
- 1877: Les Deux Jardiniers, one-act opéra comique with Théodore de Banville, Opéra-Comique
- 1879: La Courte Échelle, three-act opéra comique, music by Edmond Membrée, Opéra-Comique
- 1880: Le Beau Solignac, five-act drama with Jules Clarétie, William Busnach, Théâtre du Châtelet

=== Other ===
- 1857: La Comédie de l'amour, novel, Michel Lévy frères, Paris
- 1884: Études dramatiques. Le théâtre français : Mme Arnould-Plessy, MM. Régnier, Got, Delaunay, Librairie de l'Art Jules Rouam, Paris
- 1886: Souvenirs et poésies diverses, foreword by Francisque Sarcey, Paris

== Honours and titles ==
- Chevalier of the Legion of Honour (12 August 1864 decree);
- officier de la Légion d'honneur au titre du ministère de l'Instruction publique et des Beaux-arts (13 July 1883 decree). Le parrain choisi par Charles de la Rounat est Camille Doucet, secrétaire perpétuel de l'Académie française.

== Bibliography ==
- Pierre Larousse, « Charles Rouvenat de La Rounat », Grand dictionnaire universel du XIXe, tome 10, Paris, 1873, p. 211, at Gallica
