= Charles Varin =

French playwright (1798–1869)

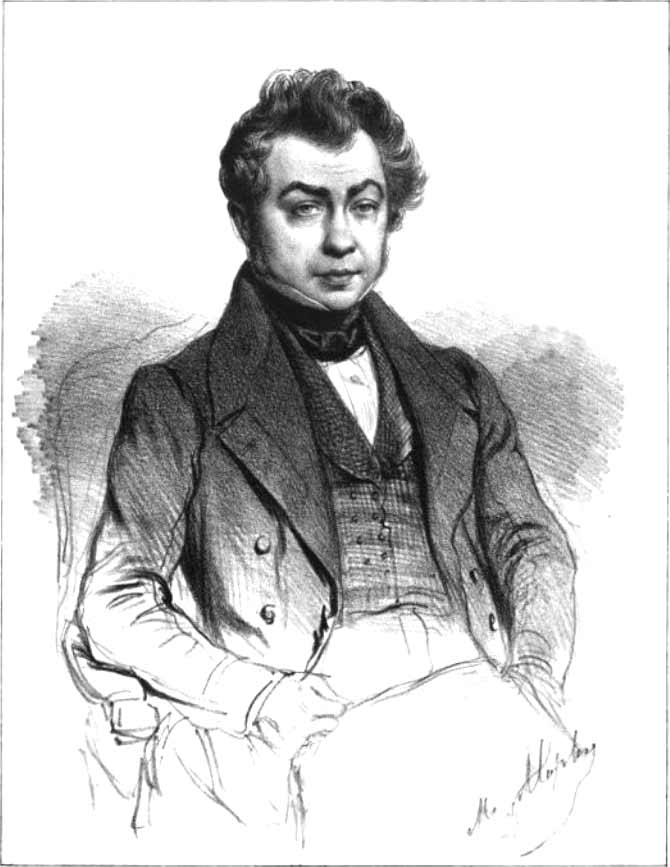
- Varin
- Born: 20 January 1798; Nancy
- Died: 24 April 1869 (aged 71); Paris
- Other names: Victor; V. Warin
- Occupation: playwright
- Years active: 1825 – 1866

Charles Voirin, called Varin, (20 January 1798 (1er pluviôse an VI) – 24 April 1869) was a 19th-century French playwright.

He also wrote under the pen names V. Warin and Victor.

== Biography ==
Destined by his father to the profession of notary, Varin spent ten years at the bottom of a study, where he once came to Paris without money. Interested in writing plays, he spent a long time to break the circle of obstacles which opposed its inception. When the first success came, around 1825, he called himself Victor first, then took the pseudonym Varin, so that his father kept in ignorance of its gains, would not suppress his student pension.

After he made his way to the stage, it provided very regularly plays, usually vaudevilles, full of gaiety and movement. He wrote mostly in company with various authors. To cite only a few: Bayard, Clairville, Desvergers, Paul de Kock, Duvert, Labiche, Auguste Lefranc, Henri Rochefort, Étienne and Jacques Arago.

In August 1864 he was awarded the Legion of Honour.

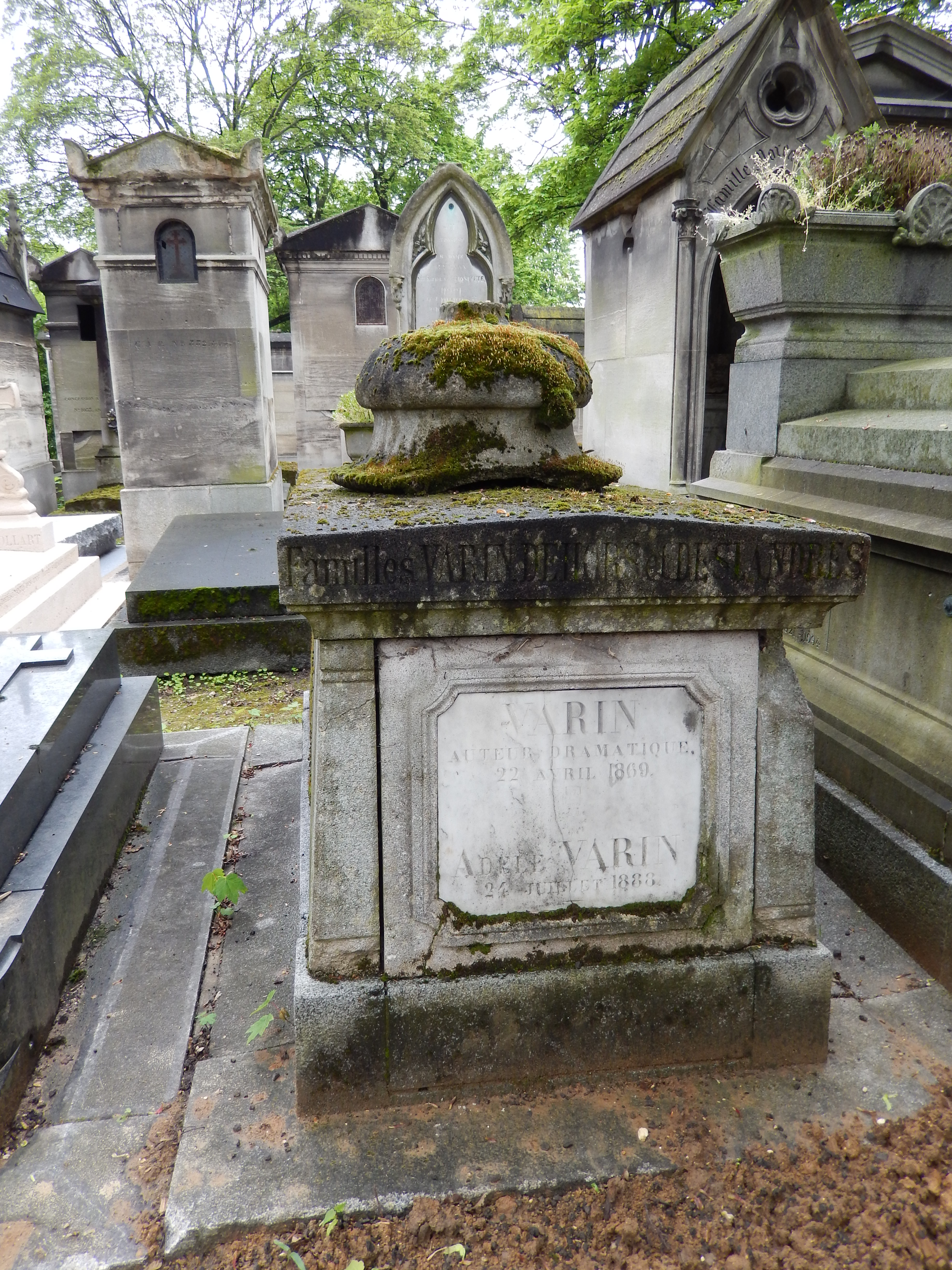
Charles Varin's grave at the Père Lachaise cemetery, (67th division)

== Theatre ==
- 1825: L’Amour et la Guerre, vaudeville in 1 act, with Étienne Arago and Desnoyers, Théâtre du Vaudeville (22 August)
- 1830: Arwed, ou les Représailles, épisode de la guerre d'Amérique, drama in 2 acts mingled with couplets, with Étienne Arago and Desvergers, Théâtre du Vaudeville (31 March)
- 1830: Un bal du grand monde, comédie-vaudeville in 1 act, with Desvergers and Monnais, Théâtre du Vaudeville (7 June)
- 1832: Les deux font la paire, comédie-vaudeville in 1 act, with Jean-François Bayard, Théâtre des Variétés (30 June)
- 1833: Les Femmes d’emprunt, comédie-vaudeville in 1 act, with Desvergers, Théâtre du Vaudeville (23 August)
- 1834: Le capitaine Roland, comédie-vaudeville in 1 act, with Édouard Monnais and Desvergers, Théâtre du Vaudeville (23 June). Ce vaudeville a été traduit en russe par le dramaturge russe Feodor Koni et est en cours sur les théâtres russes toujours
- 1835: Au clair de la lune, ou les Amours du soir, vaudeville in 3 acts, with Desvergers and Lubize, Théâtre des Variétés (11 February)
- 1836: Un bal du grand monde, comédie-vaudeville in 1 act, with Desvergers, Théâtre du Vaudeville (7 June)
- 1837: 3e et 4e au-dessus de l’entresol, vaudeville in 1 act, with Duponchel, Théâtre des Variétés (20 July)
- 1837: Le Mari à la ville et la femme à la campagne, comédie-vaudeville in 2 acts, Théâtre du Vaudeville (3 August)
- 1838: Les Saltimbanques, comédie-parade in 3 acts, mingled with couplets, with Dumersan, Théâtre des Variétés (25 January)
- 1838: La Demoiselle majeure, comédie-vaudeville in 1 act, with Laurencin, Théâtre du Vaudeville (5 April)
- 1838: Le puff, vaudeville in 3 tableaux, with Pierre Carmouche and Louis Huart.
- 1839: Un jeune homme charmant, drame-vaudeville in 5 acts, with Paul de Kock, Théâtre de la Gaîté (13 August)
- 1840: La Jolie Fille du faubourg, comédie-vaudeville in 3 acts, with Paul de Kock, from the latter's novel, Théâtre du Vaudeville (13 July)
- 1841: Un grand criminel, vaudeville in 2 acts, with Jacques Arago and Lefranc, Théâtre du Vaudeville (24 July)
- 1843: Paris, Orléans et Rouen, comédie-vaudeville in 3 acts, with Bayard, Théâtre du Palais-Royal (1 September)
- 1844: Une invasion de grisettes, vaudeville in 2 acts, with Étienne Arago, Théâtre du Palais-Royal (16 December)
- 1845: L'Enfant de la maison, vaudeville in 1 act, with Labiche and Eugène Nyon, théâtre du Gymnase (21 November)
- 1845: Les Sept Merveilles du monde, revue in 5 tableaux, extravaganza mingled with couplets, with Pierre Carmouche, Théâtre du Gymnase-Dramatique (26 July)
- 1847: Amour et Biberon, comédie-vaudeville in 1 act, with Dumersan, Théâtre du Palais-Royal (8 February)
- 1848: L'Académicien de Pontoise, comédie-vaudeville in 2 acts, with Varner, Théâtre Montansier (22 April)
- 1850: Traversin et Couverture, parody of Toussaint Louverture in 4 acts mingled with a few verses and much prose, with Labiche, Théâtre du Palais-Royal (26 April)
- 1851: Le Docteur Chiendent, ou l’Héritage de Rocambole, vaudeville in 2 acts, Théâtre des Variétés (10 April)
- 1854: Deux profonds scélérats, pochade, with Labiche, Théâtre du Palais-Royal (24 February)
- 1859: Une giroflée à cinq feuilles, comédie-vaudeville in 1 act, with Edouard Montagne, Théâtre du Palais-Royal (1 April)
- 1860: Je suis mon fils, comédie-vaudeville in 1 act, with Henri Rochefort, Théâtre du Palais-Royal (4 February)
- 1860: Les Trois Fils de Cadet-Roussel, comédie-vaudeville in 3 acts, with Laurencin and Michel Delaporte, Théâtre du Palais-Royal (1 June)
- 1861: Ma sœur Mirette, comedy in 2 acts, mingled with songs, with Delaporte, Théâtre du Vaudeville (30 June)
- 1862: Ah ! que l’amour est agréable !, vaudeville in 5 acts, with Delaporte, Théâtre du Palais-Royal (21 July)
- 1863: Un ténor pour tout faire !, operetta in 1 act, with Delaporte, music by Victor Robillard, Théâtre du Palais-Royal (15 November)
- 1864: Les Ficelles de Montempoivre, vaudeville in 3 acts, with Delaporte, Théâtre du Palais-Royal (27 August)
- 1865: Les Filles mal gardées, comedy in 3 acts, with Delapoerte, Théâtre du Gymnase-dramatique (26 July)
- 1866: Madame Ajax, play in 3 acts, with Delaporte, Théâtre du Vaudeville (27 August)
- 1866: Le Baudet perdu, paysannerie in 1 act, with Delaporte, Théâtre du Palais-Royal (3 April)
