= Alexandre Basset =

French writer and playwright

Alexandre-André Basset (11 September 1796 – 22 April 1870) was a 19th-century French writer and playwright. He also wrote under the pseudonyms Alexandre and d'Ornoy.

From May 1845 to May 1848, he was managing director of the Opéra-Comique.

== Biography ==
André Alexandre Basset was born in Nice on 25 Fructidor, Year IV (11 September 1796), to Pierre Basset (1758–1810), Adjutant general and commander of Villefranche, and Eulalie Robert. He studied at high school in Marseille and joined the Var Garde Mobile at the end of the Empire. He was a lieutenant in the King's Bodyguard in 1816 during the Bourbon Restoration in France. From 1820 onwards, he began writing for the theater, was appointed to the commission for the examination of dramatic works, and became director of the Opéra-Comique from May 1845 until May 1848. He subsequently became editor-in-chief of the newspapers La Patrie (French newspaper) in 1850 and Le Pays in 1856. He was made a Legion of Honour on May 5, 1839.

From his marriage in 1821 to Marie Célestine Françoise Vasseur, the writer Adrien Charles Alexandre Basset, known as Adrien Robert, was born in Paris. His daughter Marie Amélie Célestine Basset married engineer Ferdinand Félix Clément Le Blanc (1820–1905), who would go on to become a government architect and civil buildings inspector.

== Theatre ==
- 1824: Veuve et Garçon, one-act comédie en vaudeville with Emmanuel Théaulon, and Théodore Pernot de Colombey, Théâtre de l'Ambigu-Comique (14 December)
- 1829: Le Cousin Frédéric ou la Correspondance, one-act comédie-vaudeville with Étienne Arago and Émile de Rougemont, Théâtre du Vaudeville (7 February)
- 1831: Heur et Malheur, vaudeville, with Félix-Auguste Duvert and Augustin-Théodore de Lauzanne de Vauroussel, Vaudeville (19 April)
- 1831: Les Enfants du pasteur, one-act drama mingled with couplets, Théâtre des Nouveautés (9 October)
- 1832: La Mort du Roi de Rome, one-act drama by d'Ornoy, Théâtre du Panthéon (26 August)

== Texts ==
- Court aperçu de la question du Monténégro, Dubuisson, Paris, 1855
