= Paul Grassot =

French stage actor

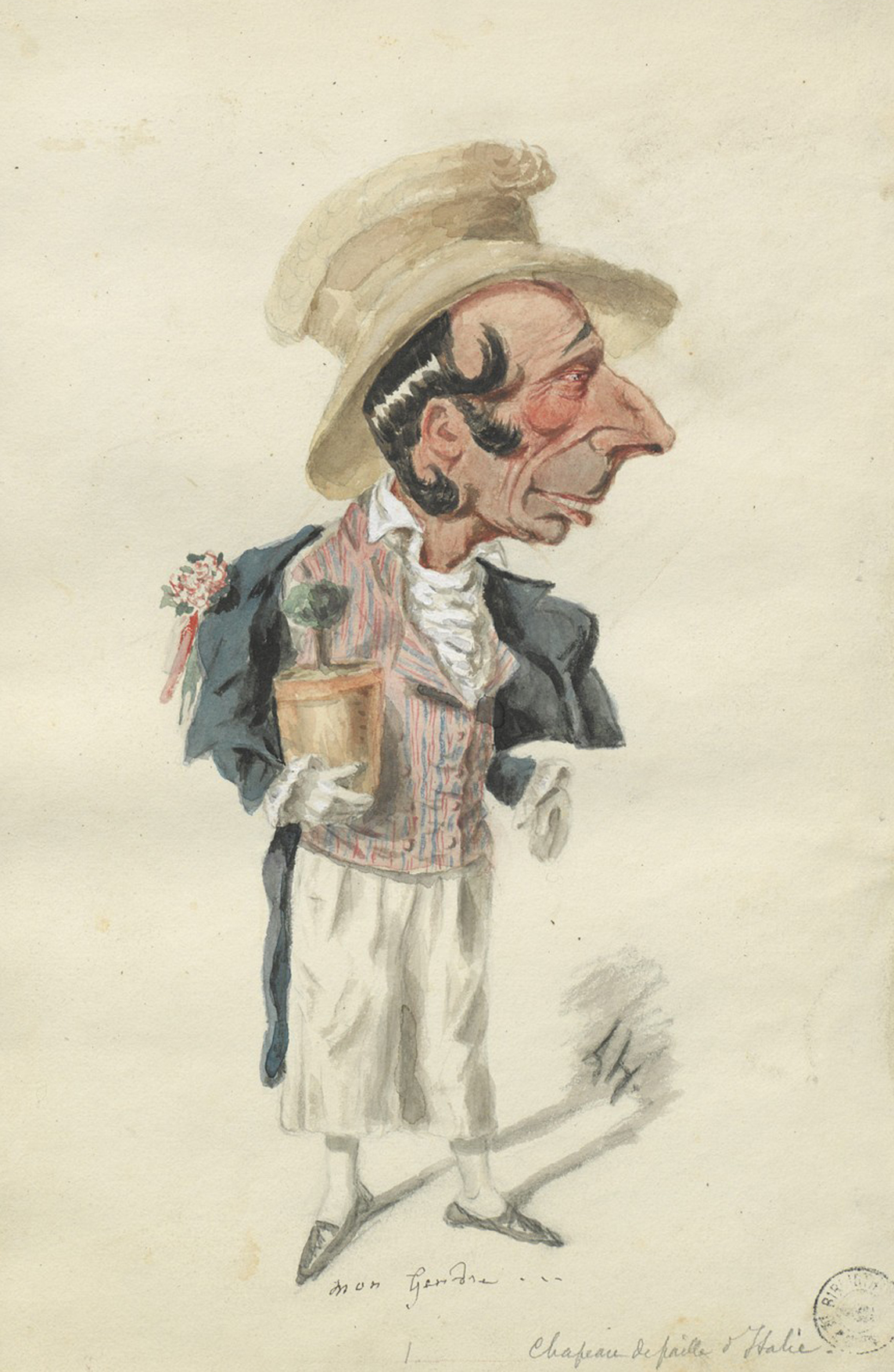
Paul Grassot in A Straw Hat from Italy (1851) by Eugène Labiche and Marc-Michel.

Paul Grassot (simply known as Grassot, born Jacques Antoine Grassot in Paris on 16 September 1799 (or 1800 or 1804), where he died on 18 January 1860) was a French stage actor.

== Biography ==
He spent his entire career at the Palais-Royal theatre. His eccentric acting, his hoarse voice and his buffoonish pantomime made him one of the most applauded comedians in Paris.

On 29 May 1852 (some sources say earlier) he married his colleague Françoise Billiard, known under the name of Madame Grassot, in Paris.

Started at the Palais-Royal in 1838. Entered the Gymnasium in 1833, with his wife.

Henry Lyonnet gave him the first name of Paul (an error which has been perpetuated), while Edmond-Denis de Manne clearly indicates in the baptismal extract the first names of Jacques Antoine. However the latter quotes an act of 22 Nivôse year VIII (12 January 1800), while the reconstituted civil status of Paris only includes one form on the date of 16 September 1799. This may also relate to different dates given for his birth and marriage.

== Theatre Credits ==
Selected credits listed below.

- 1838: Monsieur de Coyllin or the Infinitely Polite Man by Eugène Labiche, Auguste Lefranc and Marc-Michel, Palais-Royal theater: M. de Coyllin
- 1839: Les Avoués en vacances, comedy-vaudeville in 2 acts by Bayard and Dumanoir, Palais-Royal theater: Zurich and Francine
- 1843: Les Hures-Graves by Dumanoir, Clairville and Paul Siraudin, Palais-Royal theater: Job aged 300
- 1844: Deux papas très bien ou la Grammaire de Chicard by Eugène Labiche and Auguste Lefranc, Palais-Royal theater: Tourterot
- 1845: Le Roi des Frontins by Eugène Labiche, Auguste Lefranc, Palais-Royal theater: Fayensal
- 1845: The Truancy of Eugène Labiche, Palais-Royal theater: Provins
- 1845: The Sick Potatoes by Clairville and Dumanoir], Palais-Royal theater: Boudin's son
- 1846: Mademoiselle ma femme by Eugène Labiche, Auguste Lefranc, Palais-Royal theater: Naquet
- 1847: A burning fever by Mélesville and Nezel, Palais-Royal theater: the count of Renardoff
- 1848: A sentimental journey by Charles Varin, Leuven and Brunswick, Théâtre du Palais-Royal
- 1848: An English channel by Eugène Labiche, Palais-Royal theater: Charençon
- 1848: A tragedy at the home of M. Grassot by Eugène Labich and Auguste Lefranc, Théâtre du Palais-Royal: Ulysse
- 1849: The Headlines of a Villain by Eugène Labiche and Saint-Yves, Palais-Royal theater: Sangredino
- 1849: Trompe-la-ball by Eugène Labiche and Auguste Lefranc, Palais-Royal theater: Crémuffendorf
- 1849: Exhibition of products from the Republic by Eugène Labiche, Dumanoir and Clairville, Palais-Royal theater: a bousingot and a socialist
- 1849: The godmothers of the year three of Dumanoir and Clairville, Palais-Royal theater: Soulouque
- 1850: Bolster and Cover by Eugène Labiche and Charles Varin, Palais-Royal theater: Salvador
- 1850: Le Sopha by Eugène Labiche, Mélesville and Charles Desnoyer, Palais-Royal theater: the Marquis de Haute-Futaie
- 1850: The Well-Guarded Girl by Eugène Labiche and Marc-Michel, Palais-Royal theater: Saint-Germain
- 1850: A ball in a dressing gown by Eugène Labiche and Marc-Michel, Palais-Royal theater: The viscount of Vert-Gazon
- 1851: Mam'zelle makes her teeth with Eugène Labiche and Marc-Michel, Palais-Royal theater: Turpin
- 1851: An Italian straw hat by Eugène Labiche and Marc-Michel, Palais-Royal theater: Nonancourt
- 1851: Martial, the heartbreak of Mélesville, Palais-Royal theater: Pipelet
- 1852: Maman Sabouleux by Eugène Labiche and Marc-Michel, Palais-Royal theater: Sabouleux
- 1852: Les Coulisses de la vie, comedy-vaudeville in 5 acts by Dumanoir and Clairville, Palais-Royal theater: Saint-Martin
- 1852: Mon Isménie by Eugène Labiche and Marc-Michel, Palais-Royal theater: Dardenbœuf
- 1853: A chest C by Eugène Labiche and Auguste Lefranc, Palais-Royal theater: Fridolin
- 1853: The Raven Hunt by Eugène Labiche and Marc-Michel, Palais-Royal theater: Montdouillard
- 1853: A flying hat from Delacour and Morand: Jobinard
- 1854: Spaniards and Boyardinos by Eugène Labiche and Marc-Michel, Palais-Royal theater: Crétinowitch
- 1855: La Perle de la Canebière by Eugène Labiche and Marc-Michel, Palais-Royal theater: Beautendon
- 1855: Les Précieux by Eugène Labiche, Marc-Michel and Auguste Lefranc, Palais-Royal theater: Carolus de Valtravers
- 1856: La Fiancée du bon coin by Eugène Labiche and Marc-Michel, Palais-Royal theater: Dindard
- 1856: La Queue de la poële by Paul Siraudin, Alfred Delacour and Lartigue: King Kaperdulaboula
- 1856: A gentleman who burned a lady by Eugène Labiche and Auguste Anicet-Bourgeois : Loiseau
- 1856 : A ball of Auvergnats by Paul Siraudin, Alfred Delacour and Lambert-Thiboust, Théâtre du Palais-Royal
- 1856 : La Queue de la poële by Paul Siraudin and Alfred Delacour, Palais-Royal theater
- 1857: The Wedding at Bouchencœur by Eugène Labiche, Albert Monnier and Édouard Martin, Palais-Royal theater: Bouchencœur
- 1858: Le Punch Grassot by Eugène Grangé and Alfred Delacour, Palais-Royal theater

Another list of credits from another source (might be some overlap) below.

1858	En avant les Chinois d’Eugène Labiche…
″	Le Punch Grassot d’Eugène Grangé…
1857	Les Vaches landaises d’Alfred Delacour…
″	Les Noces de Bouchencœur d’Eugène Labiche…
″	La Dame aux jambes d'azur d’Eugène Labiche…
1856	Un monsieur qui a brûlé une dame d’Eugène Labiche…
″	La Queue de la poële de Paul Siraudin…
″	La Fiancée du bon coin d’Eugène Labiche…
1855	Les Précieux d’Eugène Labiche…
″	Un bal d'auvergnats de Paul Siraudin…
″	La Perle de la Canebière d’Eugène Labiche…
1854	Espagnolas et Boyardinos d’Eugène Labiche…
1853	Un chapeau qui s'envole d’Alfred Delacour…
″	La Chasse aux corbeaux d’Eugène Labiche…
″	Un ut de poitrine d’Eugène Labiche…
1852	Mon Isménie d’Eugène Labiche…
″	Le Terrible Savoyard de Hippolyte Cogniard…
″	Maman Sabouleux d’Eugène Labiche…
″	Los dansores espagnolas de Jean-François Bayard…
1851	Un chapeau de paille d'Italie d’Eugène Labiche…
″	Mam'zelle fait ses dents d’Eugène Labiche…
″	Martial, le casse-cœur de Mélesville
1850	Un bal en robe de chambre d’Eugène Labiche…
″	La Fille bien gardée d’Eugène Labiche…
″	Le Sopha d’Eugène Labiche…
″	Traversin et Couverture d’Eugène Labiche…
″	Le sous-préfet s'amuse de Jean-François Bayard…
1849	Les Marraines de l'an III de Dumanoir…
″	Exposition des produits de la République d’Eugène Labiche…
″	Trompe-la-balle d’Eugène Labiche…
″	Les Manchettes d'un vilain d’Auguste Lefranc…
1848	Une tragédie chez monsieur Grassot d’Eugène Labiche…
″	Une chaîne anglaise d’Eugène Labiche…
″	Un voyage sentimental de Charles Varin…
1847	Les Chiffonniers de Jean-François Bayard…
″	Une fièvre brûlante de Théodore…
1846	Le Bonhomme Richard de Mélesville…
″	La Garde-malade de Paul de Kock…
″	Mademoiselle ma femme d’Auguste Lefranc…
1845	L'Almanach des 25000 adresses de Ferdinand de Villeneuve…
″	Sylvandire d'après Alexandre Dumas
″	Le Roi des Frontins d’Eugène Labiche…
1844	Deux papas très bien d’Eugène Labiche…
″	L'Étourneau de Jean-François Bayard…
1841	La Sœur de Jocrisse d’Antoine-François Varner…
″	Les Secondes Noces de Mélesville…
″	Madame Camus et sa demoiselle de Dumanoir…
1840	Les Dîners à trente-deux sous de Théodore Cogniard…
1839	Pascal et Chambord d’Auguste Anicet-Bourgeois…
1838	Les Coulisses de Hippolyte Cogniard…
″	Monsieur de Coyllin de Paul Dandré

== Note ==
1. ↑ It was Henry Lyonnet who first gave him the first name of Paul (an error which has been perpetuated), while Edmond-Denis de Manne clearly indicates in the baptismal extract the first names of Jacques Antoine . However the latter quotes an act of 22 Nivôse year VIII (12 January 1800), while the reconstituted civil status of Paris only includes one form on the date of 16 September 1799...
2. ↑ Paris, Reconstructed civil status, view 11/26. [ archive ]
3. ↑ Death record in Paris 1 st, 14/21 view. [ archive ]
4. ↑ Paris, Reconstructed civil status, view 20/49. [ archive ]
5. ↑ Portrait of Grassot in the role of Pipelet by Lhéritier [ archive ] read online at Gallica .
6. ↑ Portrait of Grassot in the role of Kaperdulaboul by Lhéritier [ archive ] read online on Gallica .
