= Augustin-Théodore de Lauzanne de Vauroussel =

Augustin-Théodore de Lauzanne
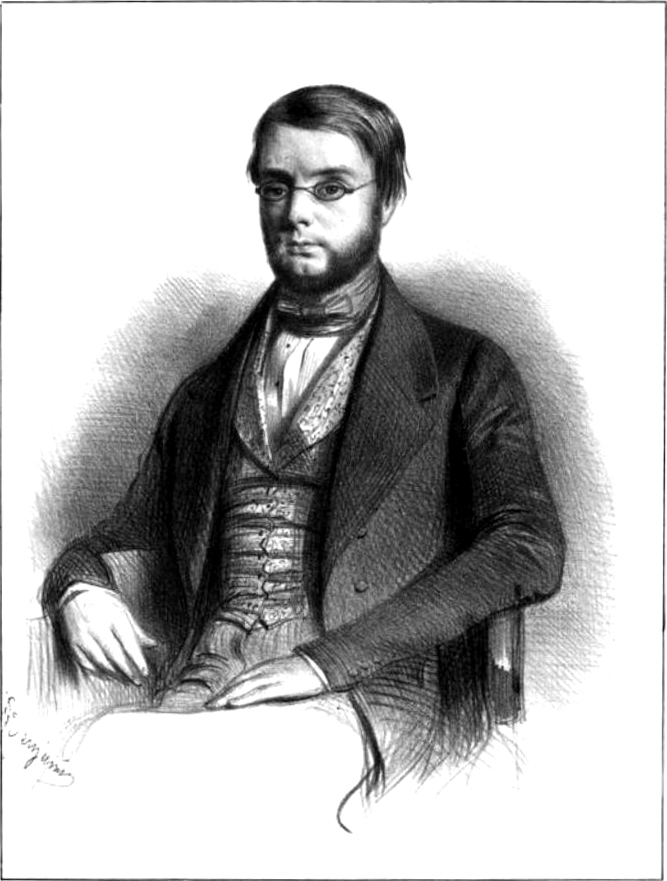
- Born: 4 November 1805; Vernelle, France
- Died: 15 October 1877 (aged 71); Paris, France
- Occupations: Playwright; Vaudevillist

Augustin-Théodore de Lauzanne, chevalier de Vaux-Roussel (4 November 1805 – 15 October 1877) was a 19th-century French playwright.

== Biography ==
Aged 13, Lauzanne came to Paris where he grew up and developed an interest in literature and especially theater. One day, a friend gave him a letter of recommendation to the playwright Félix-Auguste Duvert, who already had some theatre plays given on stage. "I once knew in a boarding house a Mr Lauzanne, who loved me very much, and made me jump on his lap, Duvert said the young man. - He was my father, answered the other." From this day were born relationships that were soon to change into true friendship. The knots of this affection were further strengthened by the marriage of Lauzanne with Duvert's only daughter.

Lauzanne made his debut in theatre with a parody in burlesques verse of the drama Hernani: Harnali, ou la Contrainte par cor (23 March 1830), interpreted by Étienne Arnal which ran many times on stage.

Lauzanne then became Duvert's preferred collaborator and the duo enjoyed many successes. The best welcomed plays include: M. Chapotard (1831); L’Assassin (1833); La Filature (1834); M. et Mme Mochard (1836); La Femme de ménage (1839); Riche d’amour, Beaugaillard, ou le Lion amoureux et Capitaine de voleurs (1846); La Poésie des amours (1849); À la Bastille, Le Pont cassé et Supplice de Tantale (1850), etc.

Made a chevalier of the Légion d'honneur in 1853, Lauzanne was buried at Père Lachaise Cemetery in the 54th division.

== Works ==
- 1830: Harnali ou la Contrainte par cor, parody in 5 tableaux of Hernani by Duvert and Lauzanne, Théâtre du Vaudeville (30 March)
- 1831: Heur et Malheur, vaudeville by Alexandre Basset, Duvert and Lauzanne, Théâtre du vaudeville (19 April)
- 1831: M. Chapolard ou le Lovelace dans un grand embarras, one-act comédie en vaudeville by Duvert, Lauzanne and Paulin, Théâtre des Variétés (25 June)
- 1832: Perruque et Chandelles, one-act vaudeville by Duvert and Lauzanne, Théâtre du vaudeville (26 April)
- 1832: Le Marchand de peaux de lapin ou le Rêve, « invraisemblance » in 3 parts by Duvert and Lauzanne, Théâtre des Variétés (16 October)
- 1833: Prosper et Vincent, two-act vaudeville by Duvert and Lauzanne, Théâtre des Variétés (7 November)
- 1834: Un scandale, one-act folie-vaudeville by Duvert and Lauzanne, Théâtre du Palais-Royal (18 January)
- 1834 : Le Huron ou les Trois Merlettes, one-act folie philosophique by Xavier, Duvert and Lauzanne after Voltaire, Théâtre des Variétés (4 February)
- 1834: Pécherel l'empailleur, one-act vaudeville by Duvert and Lauzanne, Théâtre du Vaudeville (28 April)
- 1834: Jacquemin, roi de France, two-act comedy mingled with songs by Duvert and Lauzanne, Théâtre du Vaudeville (8 September)
- 1834: La Filature, three-act comédie en vaudeville by Duvert and Lauzanne, Théâtre du Palais-Royal (28 October)
- 1835: Le Jugement de Salomon, one-act vaudeville by Duvert and Lauzanne, Théâtre des Variétés (3 November)
- 1836: Elle n'est plus ! (sequel of Simple histoire), one-act comédie en vaudeville by Duvert and Lauzanne, Théâtre de la Gaîté (22 January)
- 1836: Le Hottentot, folie-vaudeville in three parts by Duvert and Lauzanne, Théâtre de la Porte-Saint-Antoine (2 February)
- 1836: Monsieur et Madame Galochard, one-act vaudeville by Xavier, Duvert and Lauzanne, Théâtre du vaudeville (6 February)
- 1836: La Fille de la favorite, three-act historical comedy by Duvert and Lauzanne, Théâtre de la Porte-Saint-Martin (11 February)
- 1836: Renaudin de Caen, two-act comédie en vaudeville by Duvert and Lauzanne imitated from Calderón, Théâtre du vaudeville (24 March)
- 1836: Capitaine de voleurs, two-act comédie en vaudeville by Xavier, Duvert and Lauzanne, Théâtre du vaudeville (14 November)
- 1837: La Laitière et les Deux Chasseurs, ou l'Ours, le Ballon, la Grenouille et le Pot au lait, « chose fort ancienne, imitée de défunt Duni et de ci-devant Anseaume » by Xavier, Duvert and Lauzanne, Théâtre du Palais-Royal (6 February)
- 1837: Michel, ou Amour et Menuiserie, four-act comédie en vaudeville by Duvert, Lauzanne and Adolphe Jaime, Théâtre des Variétés (16 February)
- 1837: Paul et Pauline, two-act comédie en vaudeville by Duvert and Lauzanne, Théâtre du Palais-Royal (5 June)
- 1837: Mina ou la Fille du bourgmestre, two-act comédie en vaudeville by Duvert and Lauzanne, Théâtre du vaudeville (4 July)
- 1838: Impressions de voyage, two-act vaudeville by Xavier, Duvert and Lauzanne, Théâtre du vaudeville (13 June)
- 1838: Les Étrennes de ma barbe, à-propos vaudeville in one act by Duvert and Lauzanne, Théâtre du Palais-Royal (31 December)
- 1839: La Femme de ménage, one-act folie by Xavier, Duvert and Lauzanne, Théatre du Palais-Royal (7 March)
- 1839: Le Plastron, two-act comedy mingled with song by Xavier, Duvert and Lauzanne, Théâtre du vaudeville (27 April)
- 1841: Un monsieur et une dame, comédie en vaudeville by Xavier, Duvert and Lauzanne, Vaudeville (27 February)
- 1841: Un monstre de femme, one-act comédie en vaudeville by Varner, Duvert and Lauzanne, Théâtre du Vaudeville (10 September)
- 1842: Le Grand Palatin, three-act comédie en vaudeville by Duvert, Lauzanne and Le Roux, Théâtre du Vaudeville (22 January)
- 1842: Carabins et carabines, two-act vaudeville by Xavier, Duvert and Lauzanne, Théâtre des Variétés (23 April)
- 1842: Les Informations conjugales, one-act vaudeville by Duvert, Lauzanne and Jaime, Théâtre des Variétés (7 November)
- 1843: Les Égarements d'une canne et d'un parapluie, folie-vaudeville by Duvert and Lauzanne, Théâtre du Palais-Royal (28 January)
- 1843: Entre ciel et terre, pochade-vaudeville de Duvert et Lauzanne, Palais-Royal (25 April)
- 1843: Jocrisse en famille, one-act folie-vaudeville by Duvert and Lauzanne, Théâtre du Palais-Royal (28 June)
- 1843: L'Homme blasé, two-act vaudeville by Duvert and Lauzanne, Théâtre du Vaudeville (18 November)
- 1844: La Bonbonnière ou Comme les femmes se vengent, one-act vaudeville by Duvert and Lauzanne, Théâtre du Palais-Royal (1 February)
- 1844: Trim ou la Maîtresse du roi, two-act vaudeville by Duvert and Lauzanne, Théâtre des Variétés (16 March)
- 1845: L'Île de Robinson, one-act vaudeville by Duvert and Lauzanne, Théâtre du Vaudeville (3 November)
- 1845: Riche d'amour, one-act comédie en vaudeville by Xavier, Duvert and Lauzanne, Théâtre du Vaudeville (20 November)
- 1845: Le Marchand de marrons, two-act comédie en vaudeville by Duvert and Lauzanne, Théâtre du Gymnase-Dramatique (22 December)
- 1846: Beaugaillard ou le Lion amoureux, one-act vaudeville imitated from a fable by La Fontaine by Xavier, Duvert and Lauzanne, Théâtre du Vaudeville (5 February)
- 1847: Le Docteur en herbe, two-act comédie en vaudeville by Duvert and Lauzanne, Théâtre du Palais-Royal (1 April)
- 1847: Ce que femme veut..., two-act comédie en vaudeville by Duvert and Lauzanne, Théâtre du Vaudeville (14 April)
- 1848: La Clef dans le dos, one-act comédie en vaudeville by Duvert, Lauzanne and Paul Duport, Théâtre du Gymnase-Dramatique (12 February)
- 1848: Hercule Belhomme, one-act comédie en vaudeville by Duvert and Lauzanne, Théâtre du Gymnase-Dramatique (30 March)
- 1849: La Poésie des amours et..., two-act comédie en vaudeville by Duvert and Lauzanne, Théâtre du Vaudeville (1 March)
- 1849: Un cheveu pour deux têtes, one-act comédie mingled with couplets by Varner, Duvert and Lauzanne, Théâtre Montansier (11 May)
- 1849: Malbranchu, greffier au plumitif, two-act comédie en vaudeville by Xavier, Duvert and Lauzanne, Théâtre du Vaudeville (26 November)
- 1849: La Fin d'une république ou Haïti en 1849, one-act à-propos-vaudeville by Duvert and Lauzanne, Théâtre du vaudeville (18 December)
- 1850: À la Bastille, one-act vaudeville by Xavier, Duvert and Lauzanne, Théâtre des Variétés (6 May)
- 1850: Le Pont cassé, one-act comédie en vaudeville by Duvert and Lauzanne, Théâtre des Variétés (10 October)
- 1850: Supplice de Tantale, one-act comédie en vaudeville by Duvert and Lauzanne, Théâtre des Variétés (31 October)
- 1851: Les Malheurs heureux, one-act comédie en vaudeville by Duvert, Lauzanne and Charles de La Rounat, Théâtre des Variétés (3 May)
- 1852: Une queue rouge, two-act comédie en vaudeville, in 3 parts by Duvert and Lauzanne, Théâtre des Variétés (17 January)
- 1852: Le Puits mitoyen, one-act folie-vaudeville by Duvert and Lauzanne, Théâtre des Variétés (25 January)
- 1852: Le Roi des drôles, three-act comedy mingled with song by Duvert and Lauzanne, music by Pierre-Julien Nargeot, Théâtre des Variétés (3 August)
- 1853: Une jolie jambe, one-act vaudeville by Duvert and Lauzanne, Vaudeville (13 March)
- 1854: Un père de famille, one-act comédie en vaudeville by Duvert and Lauzanne, Gymnase-Dramatique (22 February)
- 1855: Le Diable, two-act vaudeville by Duvert and Lauzanne, Variétés (12 January)
- 1856: Riche de cœur, one-act comédie en vaudeville by Duvert and Lauzanne, Gymnase-Dramatique (26 September)
- 1858: Le Hanneton du Japon, one-act comédie en vaudeville by Duvert and Lauzanne, Palais-Royal (27 March)
- 1858: Macaroni d'Italie, one-act vaudeville by Duvert, Lauzanne and H. L***, Variétés (12 April)
- 1858: En revenant de Pondichéry, two-act comedy mingled with couplets by Duvert and Lauzanne, Palais-Royal (2 December)
- 1859: Voyage autour de ma chambre, one-act opéra comique by Xavier, Duvert and Lauzanne, music by Albert Grisar, Opéra-Comique (12 August)

== Bibliography ==
- Gustave Vapereau, « Augustin-Théodore de Lauzanne de Vaux-Roussel » Dictionnaire universel des contemporains, Hachette, Paris, 1880, p. 1100, at Gallica.
