= Armand Montjoye =

French painter and playwright (1816–1871)

Armand Montjoye, real name Jules Joseph Montjoye, (8 February 1816 in Paris – 13 January 1871 in Paris) was a 19th-century French painter and playwright.

== Biography ==
A son of the dancer Louis-Stanislas Montjoie (1789 – 1865), a student of Jean-Dominique Ingres at the École des Beaux-Arts (1832), he first began to paint and exhibited a portrait of his father at the Salon of 1835. In 1839 he realised Jésus tenté par le diable and in 1842 an Autoportrait. These paintings are preserved at the national museum of the Château de Versailles He then embarked into the Theatre (1843).

His plays were presented on the most significant Parisian stages of his time including the Théâtre des Variétés, the Théâtre des Folies-Dramatiques, and the Théâtre de la Gaîté.

== Plays ==
- 1843: Le Saut périlleux, vaudeville in 1 act, with Saint-Yves
- 1848: Almanach Astrologique, Magique, Prophétique, Satirique et des Sciences Occultes. Annuaire du Monde Élégant pour 1848
- 1849: Les Associés, vaudeville in 1 act, with Charles de La Rounat
- 1851: Un Monsieur qui n'a pas d'habit, comédie-vaudeville in 2 acts, with Jautard
- 1852: Piccolet, comédie-vaudeville in 1 act, with Eugène Labiche and Auguste Lefranc
- 1852: Une Rivière dans le dos, comédie-vaudeville in 1 act, with Delacour
- 1853: Un Homme entre deux airs, comédie-vaudeville in 1 act, with Alfred Delacour and de La Rounat
- 1853: Le Jour de la blanchisseuse, vaudeville in 1 act, with Amédée de Jallais
- 1853: Pulchriska et Léontino, pochade mingled with couplets, with de La Rounat
- 1854: Un Fils malgré lui, folie-vaudeville in 2 acts, with Armand-Numa Jautard
- 1854: Un Roi malgré lui, comedy in 2 acts, mingled with songs, with Jautard
- 1854: Eva, three-act play mingled with songs, with Raymond Deslandes
- 1855: Une Panthère de Java, pochade mingled with couplets, with de La Rounat
- 1855: Le Testament de Polichinelle, opéra-bouffe in 1 act
- 1856: S'aimer sans y voir, folie-vaudeville in 1 act
- 1864: Ajax et sa blanchisseuse, comédie vaudeville in 3 acts, with Eugène Grangé and Alexandre Charles Chaulieu, 1864
- 1864: Une Femme qui ne vient pas; scène de la vie de garçon

== Paintings ==
- 1835: Portrait de Louis-Stanislas Montjoie
- 1835: François de Bourbon, comte de Vendôme (1470-1495), Musée national des Châteaux de Versailles et de Trianon.
- 1839: Jésus tenté par le diable
- 1839: Portrait de l'architecte Latapie, Musée national du château de Pau.
- 1842: Autoportrait
- 1843: Bonaparte, Conseil général de l'Indre (Châteauroux).
- c.1849: Saint Louis après la bataille de Damiette, église paroissiale Saint-Pierre de Saint-Arnoult-en-Yvelines.
- undated: Trompette de Carabiniers à cheval, (watercolour)
- 1860: Empereur Napoléon III, city-hall Le Mans.

== Bibliography ==
- Emmanuel Bénézit, Dictionnaire critique et documentaire des peintres, 1956, (p. 288)
