= Alcide Tousez =

French actor

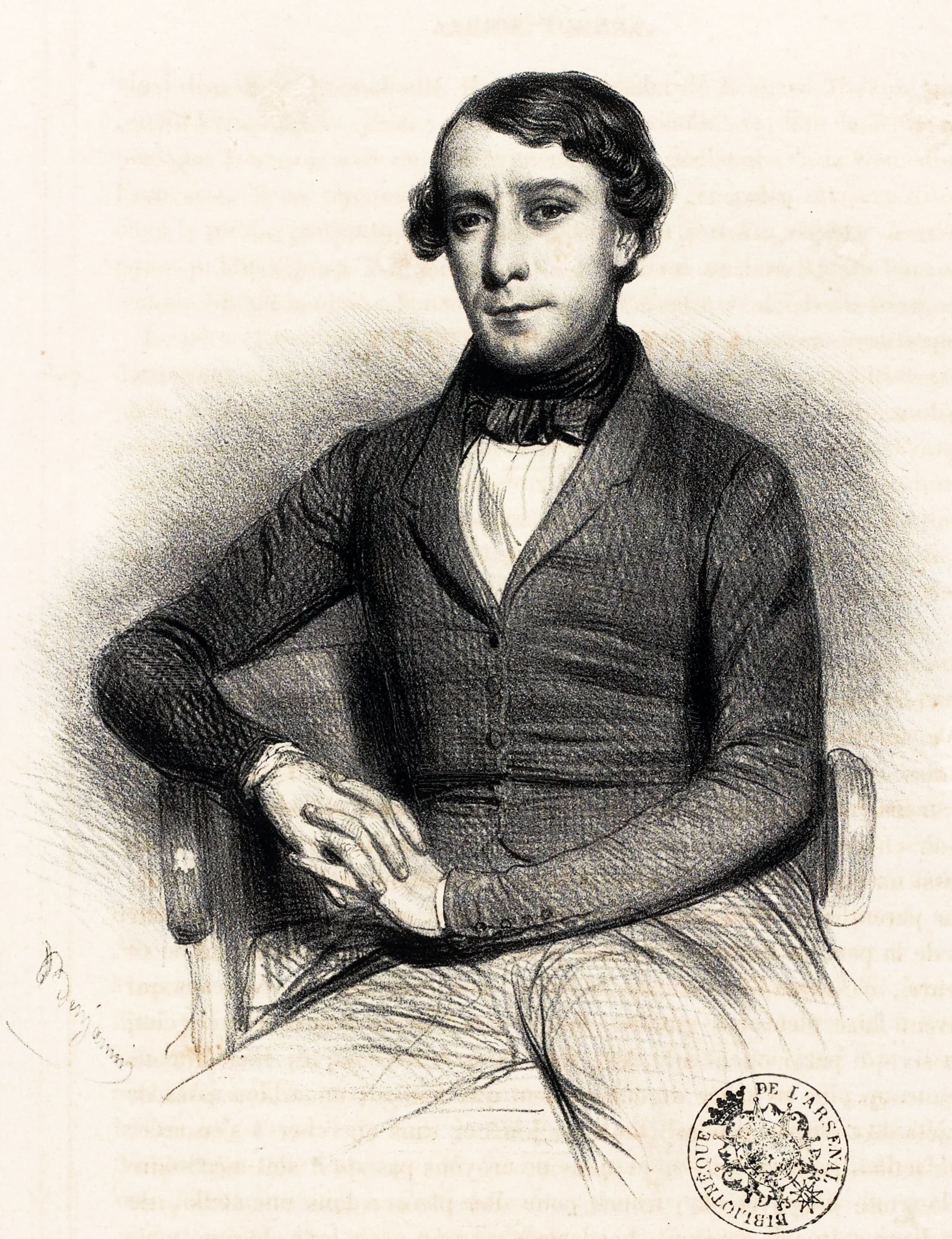
- Born: Étienne Augustin Tousez; 25 April 1809; Paris
- Died: 23 October 1850 (aged 41); Paris
- Occupation: Stage actor

Étienne Augustin Tousez known as Alcide Tousez, (25 April 1809 – 23 Octobre 1850) was a French stage actor.

He was drawn to a dramatic career by the example of his family. Although his father was a stove fitter, one of his brothers, Léonard, played leading roles at the Théâtre des Variétés, and his sister, née Regnier de la Brière, performed tragedies at the Comédie-Française. His nephew made a career of acting under the name Regnier.

Alcide began in 1825 in small theaters, playing young handsome men. Such parts did not correspond to his appearance, which included a long nose and pockmarked face, so he quickly turned to comic roles.

On 6 April 1833 he joined the Théâtre du Palais-Royal. His burlesque attitude and foolish, languishing look did wonders in grotesque or stupid parts. He also knew how to sound comic with a speedy and unclear voice or by singing in a way that seemed a challenge to the ears. During his 17 years at the Palais Royal, he played 140 different characters, usually with great success.

He wrote some small books such as La vie de Napoléon racontée dans une fête de village (1834).

In 1850, aged only 44, he died after long suffering and excruciating agony. He was survived by a daughter who also was a comedian.

== Some parts ==
- 1825: Nérestan in Zaïre
- 1833: Maclou in Le Valet de ferme
- 1839: Pomard, avoué in Les avoués en vacances (Dumanoir and Bayard)
- 1840: Bozonet in Le Lierre et l'Ormeau (Eugène Labiche)
- 1842: Narciskoff in La dragonne (Dumanoir and Hippolyte Le Roux)
- 1843: Gobelair in Les Hures-Graves (Dumanoir, Clairville and Paul Siraudin)
- 1844: Camérani in Carlo et Carlin (Mélesville and Dumanoir)
- 1845: Thomas in Le Roi des Frontins (Eugène Labiche)
- 1845: Verbulot in L'École buissonnière (Eugène Labiche)
- 1848: Colardeau in Un jeune homme pressé (Eugène Labiche)
- 1848: A Monsieur in Le Club champenois (Eugène Labiche)
- 1848: Un garçon de théâtre in Une tragédie chez M. Grassot (Eugène Labiche)
- 1850: General Machin in Traversin et Couverture (Eugène Labiche)
- And also in
  - La pêche aux beaux-pères
  - L'Aumonier du régiment
  - Les Bains à domicile
  - La Chambre à deux lits
  - Première lance de l'Allemagne (his last role) in 1850
