= Jules-Théophile Boucher =

French actor (1847–1924)

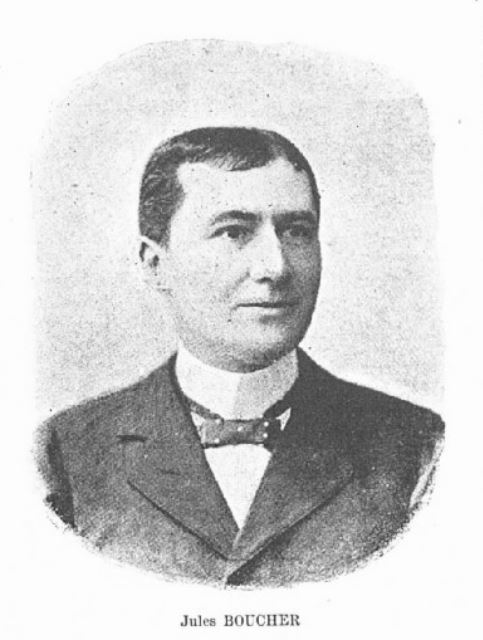
- Born: 15 September 1847; Troyes
- Died: 26 November 1924 (aged 77); 4th arrondissement of Paris
- Occupation: Actor

Jules-Théophile Boucher (15 September 1847 – 26 November 1924) was a 19th-century French actor.

A student of François-Joseph Regnier at the Conservatoire, he won first prize of comedy in 1866.

== Theatre ==
=== At the Comédie-Française ===
Admission in 1866
Appointed 340th sociétaire in 1888
Retired in 1901

- L'Étourdi ou les Contretemps
- La Plus Belle Fille du monde
- Tabarin
- Amoureuse Amitié
- Les Folies amoureuses
- The Barber of Seville
- Le Bonhomme Jadis
- Le Cercle ou la Soirée à la mode
- Mercadet
- Les Faux Bonshommes
- Charles VII chez ses grands vassaux
- Les Demoiselles de Saint-Cyr
- Bataille de dames
- Grosse Fortune
- Les Petites Marques
- Orgon
- L'Étrangère
- Le Tricorne enchanté
- Henri III et sa cour
- Tartuffe
- L'Abbé Corneille
- Un mariage sous Louis XV
- L'École des femmes
- L'Avare
- L'Aventurière, Les Rantzau (à Londres)
- Les Précieuses ridicules
- Le Monde où l'on s'amuse
- La Métromanie
- Le Dépit amoureux
- Mme Desroches
- Le Coq de Mycille
- Au printemps
- Phèdre
- Le Verre d'eau
- La joie fait peur
- Le Lion amoureux
- Maurice de Saxe
- Les Enfants
- Les Fâcheux
- Le Joueur
