= François-Joseph Regnier =

French actor and playwright (1807–1885)

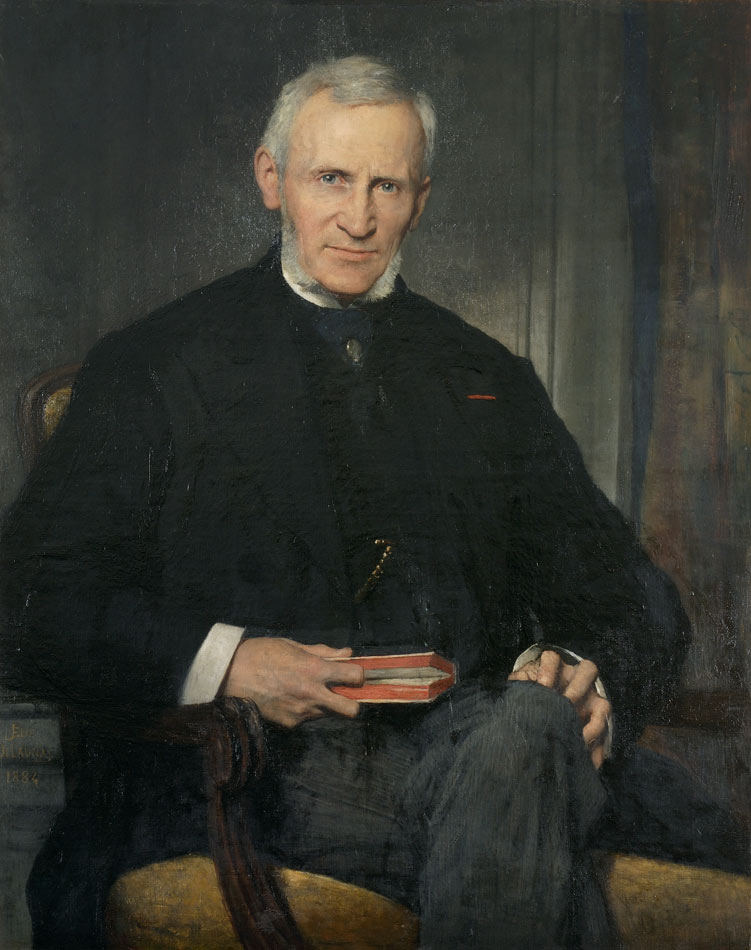
Régnier by Jules-Élie Delaunay (1884)

François-Joseph-Philoclès Regnier de La Brière called Regnier (1 April 1807, in Paris – 27 April 1885, in Paris) was a 19th-century French actor and playwright. The comedian Alcide Tousez was his uncle.

== Biography ==
After he studied at the Oratorians, he made his comedian debut at the Théâtre Montmartre in 1826 then toured the French provinces, particularly in Metz and Nantes. He was admitted at the Comédie-Française in 1831, became a sociétaire in 1835 then the dean in 1865 before retiring in 1871. In 1884, he also became a professor at the Paris Conservatory, where among his students were Réjane, Marguerite Durand, Jules-Théophile Boucher and Constant Coquelin.

=== Theatre ===
==== Career at the Comédie-Française ====
- admitted in 1831
- appointed 255th sociétaire in 1835; became dean in 1865
- retired in 1871

=== Anecdote ===
In a letter from 1876 Regnier says that the unusual first name of Philoclès comes from the French translation of Agathocle by Christoph Martin Wieland whose his godfather was a great admirer. The name of Charles was substituted at his baptism, but the destruction of civil registers during the Paris Commune allowed him to recover it at the time of the reconstitution of his birth certificate.

== See also ==
- List of French actors
- List of French playwrights

== Bibliography ==
- Georges d'Heylli, Regnier, sociétaire de la Comédie-Française, Librairie générale, 1872.
- Henry Lyonnet, Dictionnaire des comédiens français, Revue universelle internationale illustrée, Genève, 1912.
- Gustave Vapereau, Dictionnaire universel des contemporains, Paris, 1865.
