= Adolphe Lemoine =

French comedian and playwright

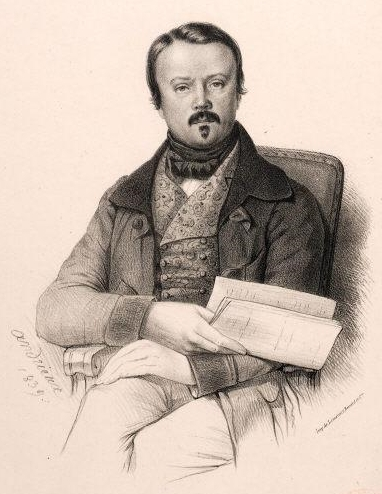
- Born: October 15, 1812; Mons, Belgium
- Died: March 6, 1880 (aged 67); Paris
- Other name: Adolphe Montigny
- Occupations: Actor, director, playwright
- Known for: director of the Théâtre du Gymnase from 1844 to 1880

Adolphe Lemoine (1812–1880), known as Lemoine-Montigny or Montigny, was a French actor, director and playwright. He was the director of the Théâtre du Gymnase from 1844 to 1880.

He married the actress Rose Chéri. He was the uncle of the comic-actress Anna Judic.

== Theatre ==
- 1832: Norbert ou le Campagnard, one-act vaudevillian comedy
- 1834: Le Doigt île Dieu, one-act drama, Théâtre de l'Ambigu-Comique
- 1834: Une Chanson, three-act vaudevillian drama, Ambigu-Comique
- 1836: Un fils, three-act drama, Ambigu-Comique
- 1836: Wilson, ou une Calomnie, three-act drama
- 1836: Amazanpo ou la Découverte du quinquina, drama in four acts and seven scenes
- 1836: La Sœur grise et l'Orphelin, melodrama in four acts and five scenes
