= Desvergers =

French playwright

Desvergers, real name Armand-Sacré Chapeau, (1794 – 3rd arrondissement of Paris 26 June 1851) was a 19th-century French playwright.

== Biography ==
Little is known about Desvergers's life except the few lines that were dedicated to him by the media, in particular on the occasion of his death, as in Le Nouvelliste 1 July 1851:

M. Chapeau Desvergers, playwright, died last Thursday at the age of 57. His funerals took place on Saturday at Notre-Dame de Bonne-Nouvelle. He was an employee at the General Post Office since 1848. He authored many vaudevilles in collaboration with MMrs. Varin and Etienne Arago

It is also known that he married Hélène-Elisa Rachel, 12 December 1822 in the 10th and had at least one son, Étienne-Armand-Albert, born 27 March 1827,

== Works ==
He wrote over a hundred vaudevilles, alone or in collaboration, between 1824 and 1848.

- 1824 (3 August): L'Anneau de Gygès, comédie-vaudeville in 1 act with Arago at the Théâtre du Vaudeville
- 1826 (9 March): Lia, ou une Nuit d'absence, drama-vaudeville in 2 acts with Arago at the Théâtre du Vaudeville, au bénéfice des incendiés de Salins
- 1827 (16 June): L'Avocat, melodrama in 3 acts and extravaganza with Arago at the Théâtre de l'Ambigu-Comique
- 1827 (27 July): Le Départ, séjour et retour, roman-vaudeville in 3 periods with Charles Varin and Arago at the Théâtre des Nouveautés
- 1828 (18 March): Yelva, ou l'Orpheline russe vaudeville in 2 parts with Scribe and Ferdinand de Villeneuve at the Théâtre de Madame
- 1828 (16 July): La Matinée aux contre-temps comédie-vaudeville in 1 act, with Duvert and Victor at the Théâtre des Nouveautés
- 1830 (3 March): Arwed, ou les Représailles, épisode de la guerre d'Amérique, drama in 2 acts mingled with couplets with Varin and Arago at the Théâtre du Vaudeville
- 1831: Les jeunes bonnes et les vieux garçons, comédie-vaudeville with Varin; Théâtre Palais-Royal, 15 October. The play was translated into the Russian language by Pyotr Karatygin and was part of the repertoire of the Russian imperial theatres
- 1833 (15 February): Une Passion vaudeville in 1 act, with Varin and ** at the Théâtre du Vaudeville
- 1833 (16 February): Une Répétition générale vaudeville in 1 act, with Scribe and Varin at the Théâtre du Gymnase
- 1833 : Les femmes d’emprunt, vaudeville in 1 act, with Varin. Le vaudeville a été traduit en russe by Piotr Karatyguine and was part of the repertoire in the Russian imperial theaters; en 2001 en Russie a été créé le film " Le Menteur Paleface " sur la base de ce vaudeville, the director was Vitaly Moskalenko
- 1834 (2 April): Théophile, ou Ma vocation comédie-vaudeville in 1 act, with Varin et Arago at the Théâtre du Vaudeville
- 1834 (25 January): Les Malheurs d'un joli garçon vaudeville in 1 act, with Varin and Arago at the Théâtre du Vaudeville. The vaudeville was translated into the Russian language by Pavel Feodorov and P.I. Valverch
- 1834 (18 November): Georgette comédie-vaudeville in 1 act, with Varin and Laurencin at the Théâtre du Vaudeville
- 1834 : Ma femme et mon parapluie, comédie-vaudeville in 1 act, with Laurencin and Varin. The vaudeville was translated into the Russian language by Piotr Karatyguine and was part of the repertoire of the imperial Russian theaters.
- 1835 (10 February): Les pages de Bassompierre, with Varin and Arago at the Théâtre du Vaudeville. The play was translated into the Russian language by Dmitry Lensky and was part of the repertoire of the Russian Imperial theaters
- 1836 (2 January): Le Oui fatal, ou le Célibataire sans le savoir comédie-vaudeville in 1 act, with Varin at the Théâtre de la Porte-Saint-Martin
- 1836 (15 July): Le Chapître des informations, comedy in 1 act, with Varin at the Théâtre du Vaudeville
- 1836 : Un bal du grand monde, vaudeville, with Charles Varin; Théâtre du Vaudeville (7 June). The vaudeville was translated into the Russian language by Pavel Feodorov
- 1836 (20 June): Balthasar, ou le Retour d'Afrique vaudeville in 1 act, with Varin and Derville at the Théâtre des Variétés
- 1836 (20 July): Casanova au Fort Saint-André vaudeville in 3 acts, with Varin and Arago at the Théâtre du Vaudeville
- 1836 (22 October): Le Tour de France, ou un An de travail vaudeville in 1 act, with Varin at the Théâtre de la Porte Saint-Antoine
- 1836 (30 October): Feu mon frère comédie-vaudeville in 1 act, at the Théâtre de l'Ambigu-Comique
- 1837 (21 September): Le Tourlourou vaudeville in 5 acts, with Varin and Paul de Kock at the Théâtre du Vaudeville
- 1837 (2 December): Mal noté dans le quartier tableau populaire in 1 act, with Hippolyte Leroux at the Théâtre du Vaudeville
- 1838 (30 July): La Cachuca, ou Trois cœurs tout neufs vaudeville with Martin and Morel at the Théâtre du Gymnase
- 1838 (9 September): L'Ouverture de la chasse tableau-vaudeville in 1 act with Gustave Albitte at the Théâtre des Variétés
- 1839 (28 January): La Gitana vaudeville in 3 acts with Laurencin at the Théâtre du Gymnase
- 1839 (15 July): Les brodequins de Lise vaudeville in 1 act with Laurencin and Gustave Vaëz at the Théâtre du Gymnase. The vaudeville was translated into the Russian language by Piotr Karatyguine and was part of the repertoire of the Russian imperial theaters
- 1845 (12 February): L'Article 170, ou un Mariage à l'étranger comedy in 2 acts with Louis Dugard at the Théâtre royal de l'Odéon
- 1847 (22 May): Barbe-Bleue, ou la Fée Perruchette, féérie-vaudeville in 3 acts and 15 tableaux with Aimé Bourdon, music by Joseph-Simon Lautz at the Gymnase des Jeunes-Élèves.
