= La Patrie (French newspaper) =

Former French newspaper

La Patrie (French pronunciation: [la patʁi]) was a French daily conservative newspaper of the July Monarchy and later the Second French Empire, and a staunch supporter of the French Imperial regime. It continued under the French Third Republic.

La Patrie, was a newspaper founded by Auguste Lireux in 1841. Its offices were located at 12 rue du Croissant, and known as République du Croissant as it included head offices of a number of publications. Its offices also overlooked la rue des Jeûneurs, with its textile, fabrics and clothes shops.

The journal with strong financial and economic coverage saw a great surge in readership when banker and deputee Théodore Casimir Delamarre took over the daily passing from an average 4,000 copies in 1846, to 20,000 copies in the mid-1850s and to 35,000 copies in 1861.
