= Pierre-Julien Nargeot =

French violinist, composer and conductor

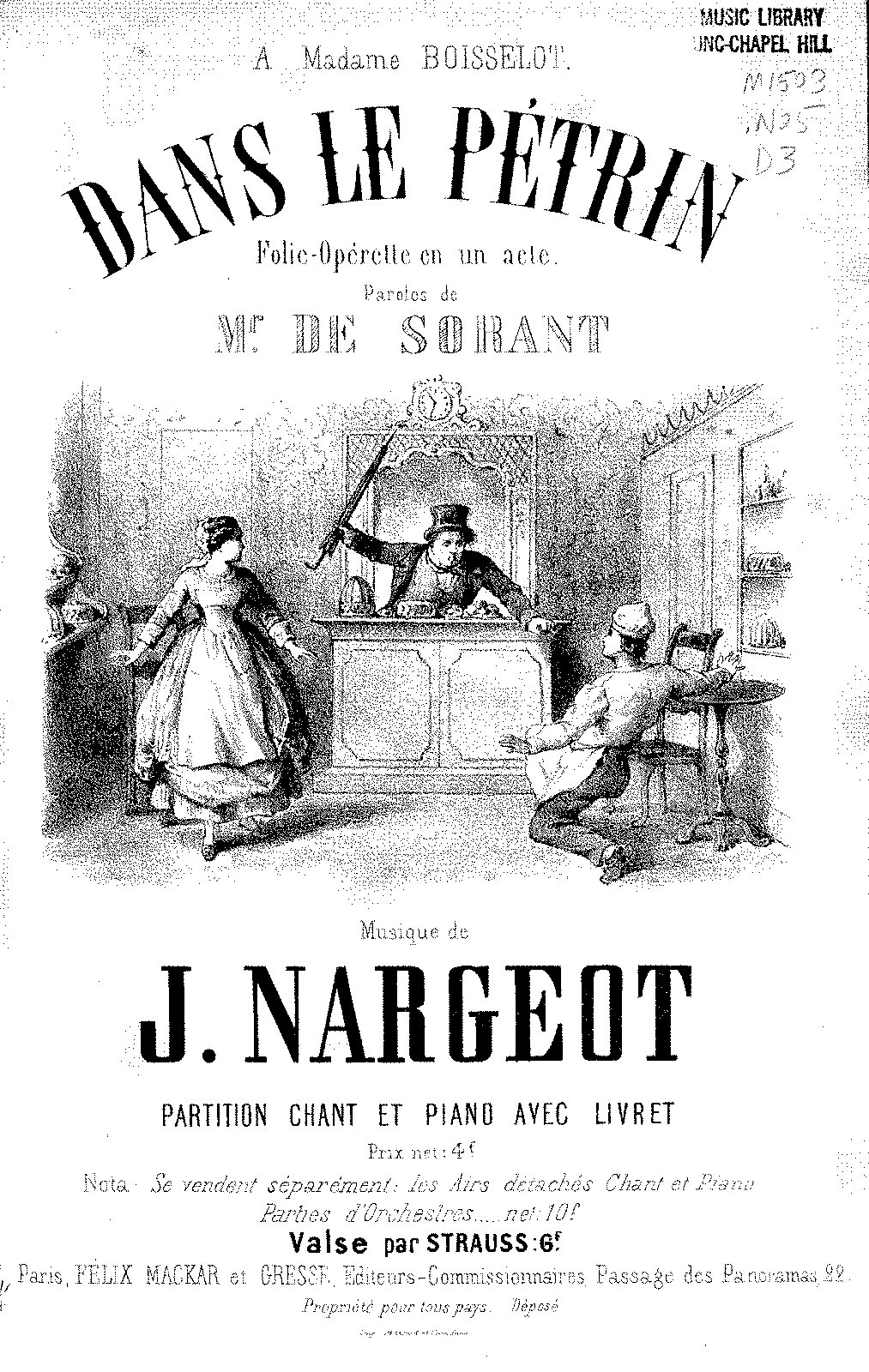
- Cover page of the operetta Dans le Pétrin, 1866
- Born: 14 January 1799; Paris
- Died: 28 August 1891 (aged 92); Paris
- Occupations: Violinist; Conductor; Composer

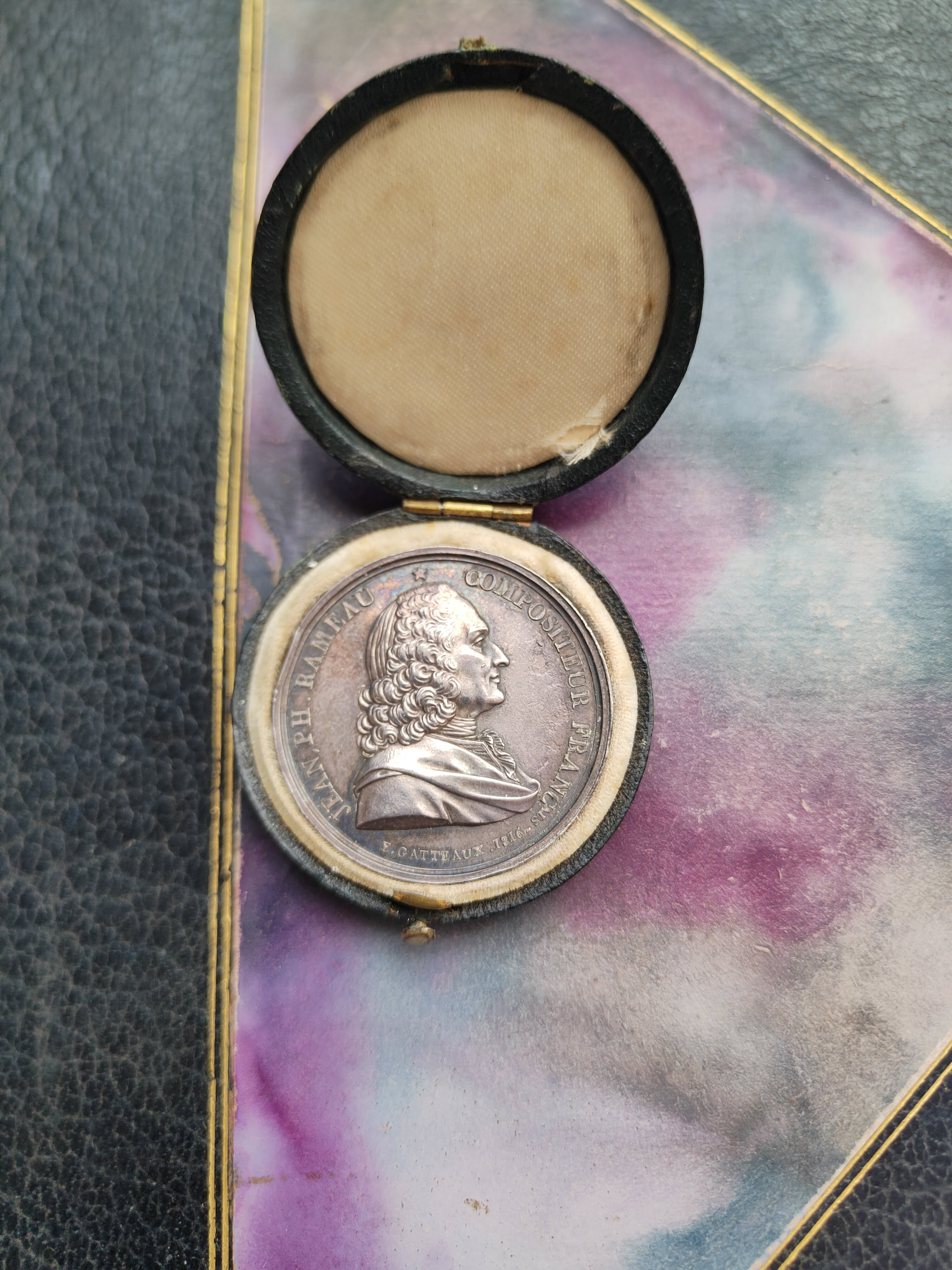
Grand Prix de Rome

Pierre-Julien Nargeot (14 January 1799 – 28 August 1891) was a 19th-century French violinist, composer and conductor.

== Biography ==
Nargeot studied music at the Conservatoire de Paris where he was admitted at age 14 in October 1813. He was a pupil of Rodolphe Kreutzer for the violin and Auguste Barbereau, Jean-François Lesueur and Antoine Reicha for composition. In 1826, he obtained a first prize in counterpoint and fugue and in 1828 a second Second Grand Prix de Rome with the scene Herminie for one voice. There was no First Prize awarded that year. Only two candidates were rewarded: Berlioz, who was running for the third time, and Nargeot.

During his studies at the Conservatoire, Nargeot was a violinist in the orchestras of Opéra-Comique and Comédie Italienne. On 31 January 1826, he joined the Opéra. He would remain there until 1 September 1839 when he was appointed conductor at Théâtre des Variétés, boulevard Montmartre. In this venue were given comédies en vaudeville and bals, which attracted a Parisian audience hungry for entertainment. The Théâtre des Variétés took a real boom under the direction of Nestor Roqueplan who presented plays by Lockroy (Le Chevalier du Guet, 1840, On demande des professeurs, 1845, Les Trois coups de pieds, 1851), Alexandre Dumas (Halifax, 1842), Théophile Gautier (Le Tricorne enchanté, 1845), Eugène Labiche (Oscar XXVIII, 1848, Madame veuve Larifla, 1849, Un Monsieur qui prend mouche, 1852), Alfred de Musset (L’Habit vert, 1849), George Sand (La Petite Fadette, 1849) and operettas by Jacques Offenbach (La Femme à trois maris, 1853, Pépito, 1853). Thus Nargeot wrote many songs, tunes, quadrilles, rondes, inserted in these plays, especially in the Tricorne enchanté by Théophile Gautier (1845) and Le Lion empaillé by Léon Gozlan (1848). Some of these scores were real successes.

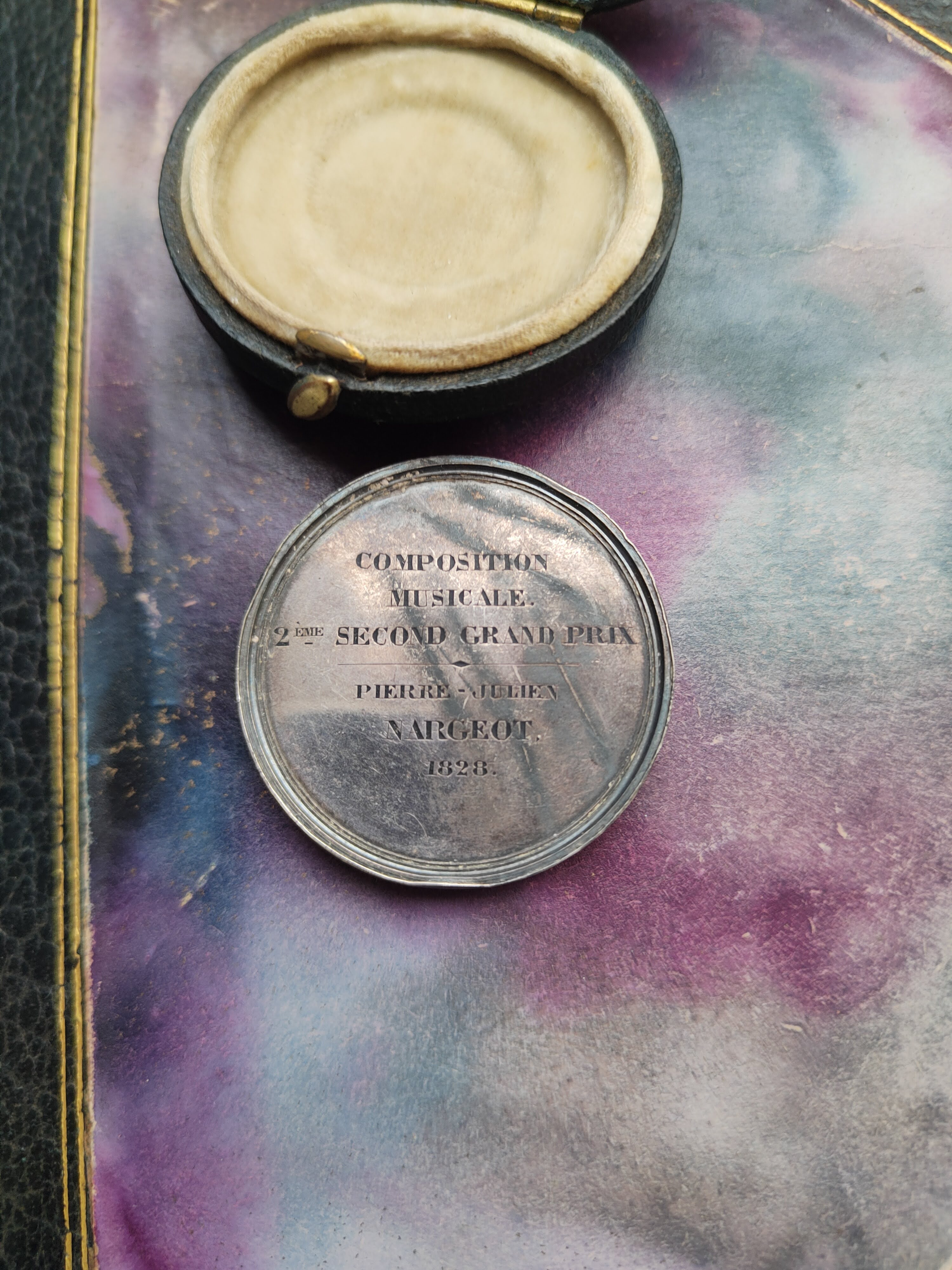
Second Grand Prix de Rome, 1828 . Pierre-Julien Nargeot

In 1853, Nargeot left the Variétés and joined, as violist, the orchestra of the Imperial Chapelle, which Napoléon III had just reopened. The director was Auber and the conductor Narcisse Girard. From 1828 to 1863, he was a member of the Orchestre de la Société des Concerts du Conservatoire.

He spent the rest of his life composing, trying to represent his operettas on stages of Parisian boulevards and died in Paris at age 92.

== Main works ==
- Air varié pour violon avec accompagnement de piano
- Plaisir d'amour for violin
- Le Petit Messelin, scène lyrique by Théodore de Banville, Folies-Nouvelles, 1855
- Trois troubadours, scène lyrique by Étienne Tréfeu, Folies-Nouvelles, 1855
- Un Monsieur bien servi!, 1856
- J. Pifferari, 1858
- Le Docteur Frontin, 1861
- Les Contrebandistas, 1861
- La Volonté de mon oncle, comédie en vaudeville, 1862
- Les Exploits de Silvestre, 1865
- Un vieux printemps, 1865
- Dans le pétrin, 1866
- Jeanne, Jeannette et Jeanneton, 1876
- Les Ouvrières de qualité, operetta
