= Jean-François Bayard =

French playwright

Jean-François Alfred Bayard
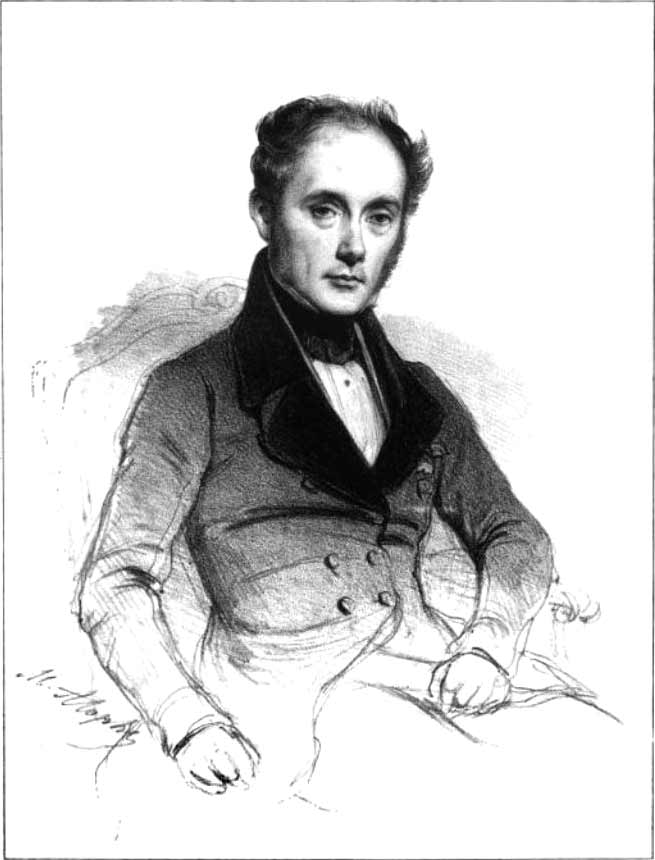
- Portrait by Marie-Alexandre Alophe
- Born: 17 March 1796; Charolles
- Died: 20 February 1853 (aged 56); Paris
- Occupation: Playwright
- Writing career
- Genre: Drama

Jean-François Alfred Bayard (French pronunciation: [ʒɑ̃ fʁɑ̃swa alfʁɛd bajaʁ]; 17 March 1796, Charolles, Saône-et-Loire – 20 February 1853, Paris) was a French playwright. He was the nephew of fellow playwright Eugène Scribe.

== Life ==
As a law student and a lawyer's clerk, Bayard wrote with passion for the theatre and, after several attempts, had a great success at the Gymnase theatre, with la Reine de seize ans (1828, in-8°). One of the most fertile-minded and skilful vaudeville writers of his era, he made a close friendship with Eugène Scribe, often collaborating with him on plays and marrying his niece.

Belonging to the school of Dancourt and Picard, he wrote with extreme ease, producing more than 200 plays for several theatres, sometimes alone, sometimes in collaboration. Many of his plays were remarked upon for their witty cheerfulness, and for not excluding sensitivity and everything else that was in vogue in the 19th century. He most often wrote vaudevilles, though he also had success with drama and even high comedy. In 1840, he collaborated with Georges Henri Vernoy de Saint-Georges on the libretto for Gaetano Donizetti's opéra comique La fille du régiment.

Despite his intensive writing schedule, Bayard devoted a large part of his time to the SACD, and was over many years one of the most active commissioners of new work from them. In this role, nearly all works on his life state that he competed with the directors of Paris's theatres.

In 1837 his family's fortunes having fallen on hard times, Bayard was forced to accept a job offer as director of the théâtre des Variétés. Although he only held the job for a short time, Bayard signalled his tenure with happier results than many who held it longer. After having begun to rehabilitate public opinion towards this theatre, which had fallen from the first rank of the théâtres des boulevards, he later felt it impossible to reconcile his writing and his tastes as an author with the demanding duties of a director and decided to leave the post. However, his last administrative act as director - choosing one of his most witty collaborators, his friend Dumanoir, as his successor - was also a happy one for the theatre. Dumanoir completed Bayard's work, allowing the théâtre des Variétés to regain its forgotten splendours.

Bayard also published articles in several literary journals, and poems and verse dramas in several anthologies. Louis Hachette published Bayard's Théâtre choisi, en 12 volumes, in-12, 1855–1858.

In 1837 Bayard was named a member of the Légion d'honneur.

== Selected works ==
- La Belle-mère;
- Christine ou la Reine de seize ans;
- Les Fées de Paris;
- Marie Mignot;
- Les Enfants de troupe;
- Les Premières armes de Richelieu;
- La Manie des places;
- La Fille de l’avare;
- Mathilde ou la jalousie;
- Le Gamin de Paris;
- La Foire aux places, comédie-vaudeville in one act;.
- Roman à vendre;
- Un ménage parisien;
- Un château de cartes, verse comedies;
- Le Mari à la campagne, his main work;
- La niaise de Saint-Flour, comédie-vaudeville in one act, by also Gustave Lemoine, 19 juin 1848 - Théâtre du Gymnase.
