= Théâtre du Gymnase Marie Bell =

Theatre in Paris, France

Coordinates: 48°52′15″N 2°20′56″E

Théâtre du Gymnase

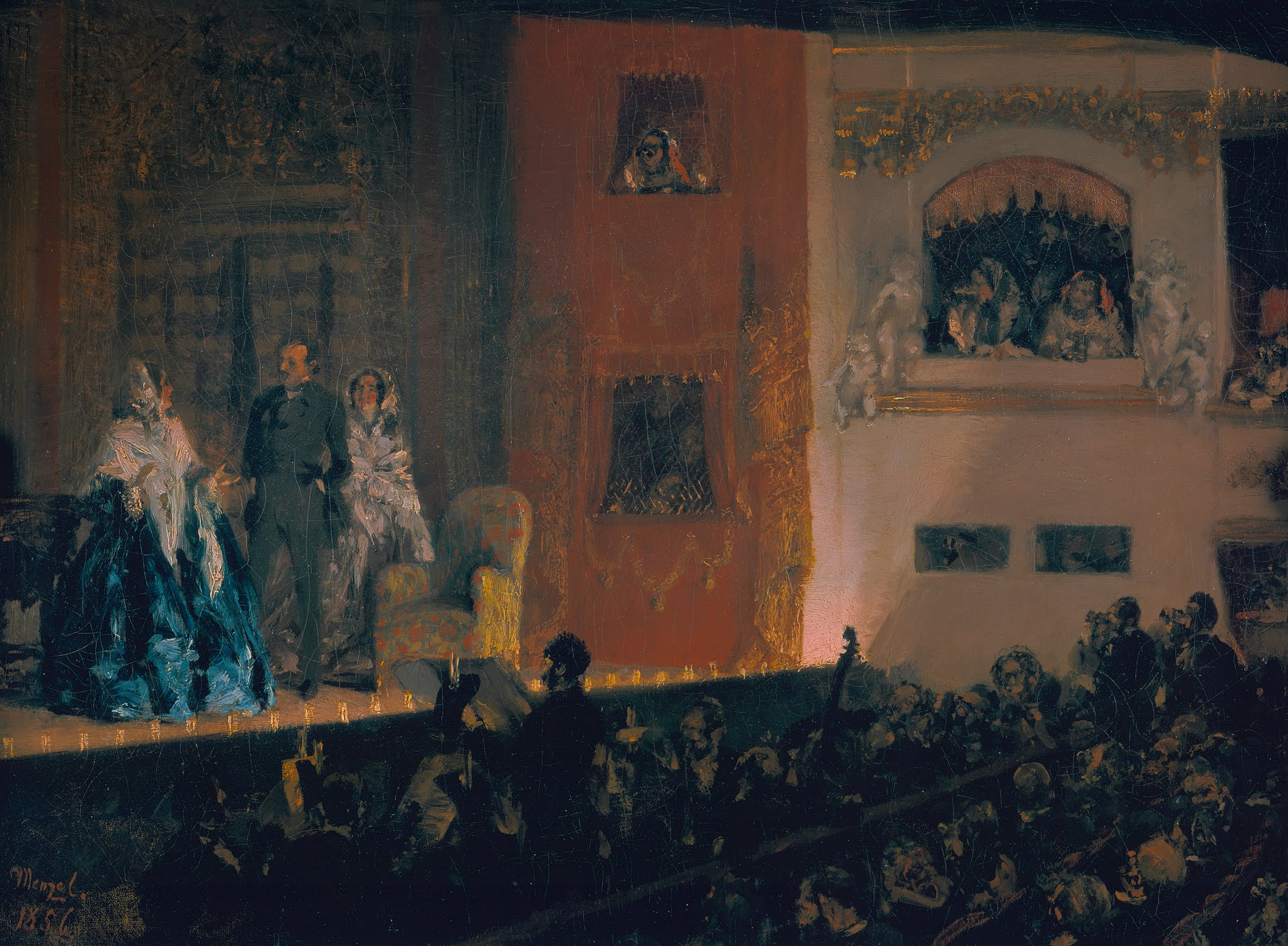
The Théâtre du Gymnase by Adolph von Menzel (1856).

The Théâtre du Gymnase or Théâtre du Gymnase Marie Bell, is a theatre in Paris, at 38 Boulevard Bonne-Nouvelle in the 10th arrondissement (métro : Bonne Nouvelle).

== History ==
Inaugurated on December 23, 1820 by Delestre-Poirson, the théâtre du Gymnase came to serve as a training-theatre for students of the conservatoire, where they could appear solely in one-act plays or adaptations of longer plays into one-act plays.

Poirson quickly added two-act plays to the theatre's repertoire, then 3-act plays, and drew up an exclusive contract with Eugène Scribe to supply them. He installed gas lighting in 1823 and in the following year, with the permission of the duchesse de Berry, the theatre was granted the title of théâtre de Madame.

Closed for renovation in 1830, the theatre reopened after the July Revolution under the name Gymnase Dramatique.

In 1844, Montigny took over as director of the theatre, and to attract a wider audience abandoned somewhat the moral and edifying pieces the theatre had previously specialised in, in favour of the then-fashionable sentimental genre, with its "compromising situations, cold turpitudes, calculated affronts, sobs and agonies". The theatre's playwrights included Balzac, Émile Augier, George Sand, Edmond About, Victorien Sardou, Octave Feuillet, Meilhac and Halévy, and Alexandre Dumas (both father and son).

In 1926, the playwright Henri Bernstein became theatre director and there put on his most famous works - Samson, La Rafaie, La Galerie des Glaces, Mélo, Le Bonheur and Le Messager.

Since 1939, the Gymnase has produced several works by Marcel Pagnol, Jean Cocteau, Marc-Gilbert Sauvajon, Sacha Guitry, Félicien Marceau and Jean Genet. The tragic actress Marie Bell took over as the theatre's director in 1962, and starred in a particularly famous production of Racine's Phèdre there.

In 2014, French baritone David Serero performed his One Man Show for six months.
