= Théodore Muret =

French playwright, poet, essayist and historian

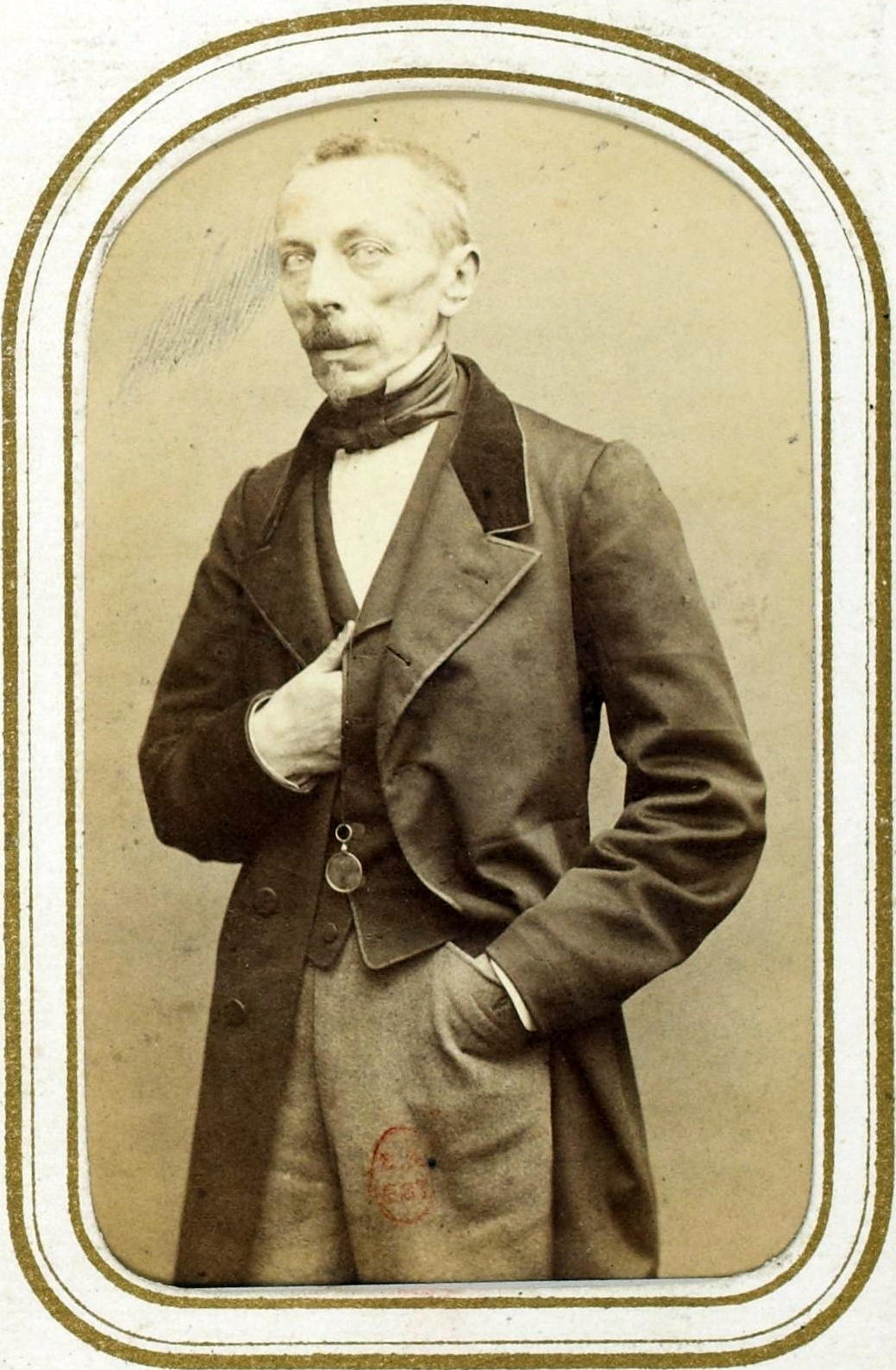
- Born: 24 January 1808; Rouen, France
- Died: 23 July 1866 (aged 58); Soisy-sous-Montmorency, France
- Occupations: Playwright, historian, essayist

Théodore César Muret (24 January 1808 – 23 July 1866) was a 19th-century French playwright, poet, essayist and historian.

== Biography ==
Born into a Protestant family expelled from France after the revocation of the Edict of Nantes, he began studying law in Rouen, which he finished in Geneva. A lawyer then a political and theater journalist with La Mode (1831–1834), La Quotidienne, L'Opinion publique (1848–1849) and also L'Union, his plays were given on the most important Parisian stages of the 19th century including the Théâtre du Palais-Royal, the Théâtre des Folies-Dramatiques, the Théâtre des Variétés, and the Théâtre de l'Odéon.

A legitimist, he was twice imprisoned for his opinions, in 1842 and 1845.

== Works ==
=== Theatre ===
- 1829: Corneille à Rouen, comedy in 2 acts
- 1831: Le docteur de Saint Brice, drama in 2 acts, with the Cogniard brothers
- 1831: Paul Ier, historical drama en 3 actes et en prose, with the Cogniard brothers
- 1835: Le Tasse à l'hôpital Sainte-Anne, scène historique (1580)
- 1837: Les droits de la femme, comedy in 1 act
- 1837: Pour ma mère !, drame-vaudeville in 1 act, with the Cogniard brothers
- 1837: Pretty, ou Seule au monde !, comedy in 1 act, mingled with song, with de Courcy
- 1837: Le Cousin du Pérou, comédie-vaudeville in 2 acts, with Michel Delaporte and Lubize
- 1838: Les coulisses, tableau-vaudeville in 2 acts
- 1838: Juana ou Deux dévouements, drama in 1 act, mingled with
- 1838: Le Médecin de campagne, comédie-vaudeville in 2 acts, with Frédéric de Courcy and Emmanuel Théaulon
- 1839: Les bamboches de l'année, revue mingled with couplets
- 1840: Le Docteur de Saint-Brice, drama in 2 acts, mingled with couplets, with the Cogniard frères
- 1840: L'Élève de Presbourg, opéra comique in 1 act
- 1840: Une journée chez Mazarin, comedy in 1 act, mingled with couplets, with Fulgence de Bury and Alexis Decomberousse
- 1841: 1841 et 1941, ou Aujourd'hui et dans cent ans, revue fantastique in 2 acts, with the Cogniard brothers
- 1841: Une vocation, comedy in 2 acts, mingled with couplets, with de Courcy
- 1842: Mil huit cent quarante et un et mil neuf cent quarante et un..., revue fantastique, with the Cogniard brothers
- 1842: Les Philanthropes, comedy in 3 acts, in verse, with de Courcy
- 1844: Les Iles Marquises, revue of the year 1843, in 2 acts, with the Cogniard brothers
- 1846: Si j'étais homme ou les canotiers de Paris, comédie vaudeville in 2 acts, with Laurencin
- 1848: Les Marrons d'Inde, ou les Grotesques de l'année, revue fantastique in 3 acts and 8 tableaux, with the Cogniard brothers
- 1851: La Course au plaisir, revue of 1851, in 2 acts and 3 tableaux, with Michel Delaporte and Gaston de Montheau
- 1856: Michel Cervantès, drama in 5 acts, in verse
- 1859: Les Dettes, comedy in 3 acts, in verse

=== History ===
- 1833: Jacques le Chouan : Madame en Vendée
- 1834: Le Chevalier de Saint-Pont (histoire de 1784)
- 1836: Gresset (Jean-Baptiste-Louis)
- 1836: Mademoiselle de Montpensier, histoire du temps de la Fronde (1652)
- 1837: Histoire de Paris depuis son origine jusqu'à nos jours
- 1837–1838: Les Grands hommes de la France, 2 vol.
- 1839: Souvenirs de l'Ouest
- 1840: Vie populaire de Henri de France
- 1842: La Vie et la mort du duc d'Orléans, prince royal
- 1843: Le Grand convoi de la ville de Rouen
- 1844: Voyage et séjour de Henri de France dans la Grande-Bretagne, octobre 1843-janvier 1844
- 1844: Histoire de l'armée de Condé, 2 vol.
- 1845: Vie populaire de Bonchamps
- 1845: Vie populaire de Cathelineau
- 1845: Vie populaire de Charette
- 1845: Vie populaire de Georges Cadoudal
- 1845: Vie populaire de Henri de La Rochejaquelein
- 1846: Mariage de Henri de France, relation populaire
- 1848: Histoire des guerres de l'Ouest : Vendée, chouannerie (1792-1815)
- 1849: Vie de Henri de France, abrégé
- 1850: Les Ravageurs
- 1850: Album de l'exil
- 1853: Histoire de Henri Arnaud, pasteur et chef militaire des Vaudois du Piémont, résumé de l'histoire vaudoise
- 1854: Les Galériens protestants
- 1860: Italie. Au roi Victor-Emmanuel, au comte de Cavour, au général Garibaldi
- 1861: Histoire de Jeanne d'Albret, reine de Navarre, preceded by a Étude sur Marguerite de Valois, sa mère
- 1865: L'Histoire par le théâtre, 1789-1851, 3 vol.

=== Essais ===
- 1835: Georges, ou Un entre mille
- 1842: Simples questions d'un ignorant au sujet des chemins de fer en général, et du chemin de fer de Paris à Rouen et au Havre en particulier
- 1843: Le Drapeau anglais
- 1849: La Vérité aux ouvriers, aux paysans, aux soldats, simples paroles
- 1849: Casse-cou ! socialisme, impérialisme, orléanisme
- 1850: Démocratie blanche
- 1851: Le Bon messager, almanach pour l'an de grâce 1842
- 1855: Paroles d'un protestant
- 1858: A travers champs, souvenirs et propos divers
- 1861: Le Théâtre-français de la rue de Richelieu, histoire théâtrale

=== Poetry ===
- undated: A propos d'un chien
- undated: Le nez rouge
- 1847: Comment on dégénère
- 1852: Paris à Dieppe, speech in verse

=== Novel ===
- 1845: Une histoire de voleur

== Bibliography ==
- Charles Dezobry, Théodore Bachelet, Dictionnaire général de biographie et d'histoire, 1869, (p. 2961)
- Gustave Vapereau, Dictionnaire universel des contemporains, vol.2, 1870, (p. 1324) Read inline
- Jules Gay, Bibliographie des ouvrages relatifs à l'amour, aux femmes..., 1872, (p. 148–149)
- George Ripley, Charles Anderson Dana, The American Cyclopaedia: A Popular Dictionary, 1875, (p. 54)
- Ludovic Lalanne, Dictionnaire historique de la France, 1877, (p. 1333)
- Camille Dreyfus, André Berthelot, La Grande encyclopédie: inventaire raisonné des sciences, 1886, (p. 575)
- Pierre Larousse, Claude Augé, Nouveau Larousse illustré: dictionnaire universel, 1898, (p. 269)
- Pierre Henri Guignard, Les servitudes foncières dans le Code civil vaudois, 1975, (p. 16)
- Edmond Biré, La presse royaliste de 1830 à 1852, 1901, (p. 365)
- Louis Aymer de La Chevalerie (marquis d'), Henri Carré, Le journal d'émigration, 1791-1797, 1933, (p. 58)
