= Michel Delaporte =

French painter (1806–1872)

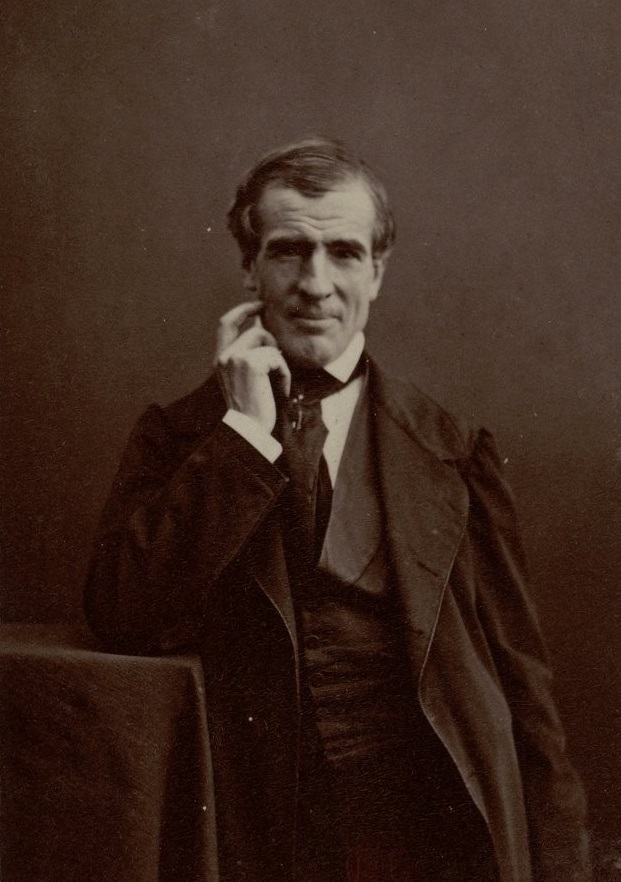
- Michel Delaporte, photographed by Nadar
- Born: 5 September 1806; Paris
- Died: 30 September 1872 (aged 66); Paris
- Occupations: Playwright, painter, lithographer

Pierre Michel Delaporte (5 September 1806 – 30 September 1872) was a 19th-century French playwright, painter, lithographer and political caricaturist.

== Biography ==
He was educated in Amiens and in 1824 became a student of Jean-Baptiste Regnault. After he suffered from an eye disease, he was forced to give up painting and thus turned to writing.

His plays were presented on the most important Parisian stages of the 19th century including the Théâtre des Folies-Dramatiques, the Théâtre du Palais-Royal, and the Théâtre des Variétés.

He also created numerous lithographies, illustrations and prints which were published in many newspapers and magazines, such as La Caricature (1830–1843) or Le Figaro.

== Works ==
- La Fille de l'air dans son ménage, vaudeville-féerie in 1 act, with Honoré, 1837
- Le Cousin du Pérou, comédie-vaudeville in 2 acts, with Lubize and Théodore Muret, 1837
- Le Parisien, comédie-vaudeville in 1 act, 1837
- Argentine, comedy in 2 acts, mingled with couplets, with Charles Dupeuty and Gabriel de Lurieu, 1839
- L'Amour d'un ouvrier, drame-vaudeville in 2 acts, with Hippolyte Lévesque, 1839
- La Bergère d'Ivry, drame-vaudeville in 5 acts, with de Lurieu, 1839
- L'Argent, la gloire et les femmes, vaudeville extravaganza, in 4 acts and 5 tableaux, with the Cogniard brothers, 1840
- L'Andalouse de Paris, vaudeville in 1 act, with Louis Bergeron, 1840
- La Mère Godichon, vaudeville in 3 acts, with Lubize, 1840
- Job l'afficheur, vaudeville in 2 acts, with the Cogniard brothers, 1840
- Pile ou face, vaudeville in 2 acts, with Lubize, 1840
- Les Amours de Psyché, fantasie play, mingled with song, in 3 acts and 10 tableaux; preceded by l'Olympe, prologue, with Charles Dupeuty, 1841
- Un Premier ténor, folie-vaudeville in 1 act, 1841
- Les Comédiens et les marionnettes, vaudeville in 2 acts, with Dupeuty, 1842
- Un Ménage de garçon, comédie-vaudeville in 1 act, with Laurençot, 1842
- Colin-Tampon, vaudeville in 1 act, with Adolphe d'Ennery, 1844
- Estelle et Némorin, pastorale bouffonne in 2 acts, mingled with songs, with Charles Potier, 1844
- Un Tribunal de femmes, vaudeville in 1 act, with Laurençot, 1844
- Le Diable à quatre, vaudeville-féerie in 3 acts, with Ernest Jaime, 1845
- Les Amours de Monsieur et Madame Denis, comédie vaudeville in 2 acts, with Auguste Anicet-Bourgeois, 1845
- Cabrion ! ou les Infortunes de Pipelet, folie-vaudeville in 1 act, 1845
- La Fille à Nicolas, comédie-vaudeville in 3 acts, with Laurençot, 1845
- La Samaritaine, vaudeville in 1 act, with de Lurieu, 1845
- Henri IV, drame historique in 3 acts, 16 tableaux and prologue, with Amable de Saint-Hilaire, 1846
- La Nouvelle Héloïse, drama in 3 acts, mingled with song, with Jacques-François Ancelot, 1846
- Ah ! que l'amour est agréable !, vaudeville in 5 tableaux, with Hippolyte-Jules Demolière and Charles Henri Ladislas Laurençot, 1847
- Les Femmes de Paris, ou l'Homme de loisir, drama in 5 acts, in prose, preceded by Un duel sans témoins, prologue, with Virginie Ancelot, 1848
- Chodruc-Duclos, ou l'Homme à la longue barbe, melodrama in 5 acts and 8 tableaux, with Alphonse Royer and Gustave Vaez, 1850
- L'Île des bêtises, vaudeville-revue of the year 1849, in 3 acts and 5 tableaux, with Honoré, 1850
- Le Raisin malade, folie fantastique in 1 act, mingled with couplets, 1850
- Les Quenouilles de verre, féerie-vaudeville in 3 acts and 8 tableaux, with Maurice Alhoy, 1851
- La Femme de ménage, ou la Tabatière de Polichinelle, vaudeville in 1 act, 1851
- La Course au plaisir, revue de 1851, in 2 acts and 3 tableaux, with Gaston de Montheau and Théodore Muret, 1851
- Les Reines des bals publics, folie-vaudeville in 1 act, with de Montheau, 1852
- La Fille de Madame Grégoire, vaudeville in 1 act, with de Montheau, 1853
- Un Moyen dangereux, comedy in 1 act, mingled with song, with Jean-François-Alfred Bayard, 1854
- Les Papillons et la chandelle, vaudeville in 1 act, 1854
- Le Bois de Boulogne, revue-féerique, mingled with couplets, in 2 acts and 5 tableaux, with Paul Duport, 1855
- Le Cousin du Roi, comedy in 2 acts, mingled with couplets, with Laurencin, 1855
- Toinette et son carabinier, croquis musical in 1 act, 1856
- Le Billet de faveur, comédie-vaudevilles in 3 acts, with Laurecin and Eugène Cormon, 1856
- Le Marquis d'Argentcourt, comédie-vaudeville in 3 acts, with Dupeuty, 1857
- Rose la fruitière, vaudeville in 3 acts, 1857
- Méphistophélès, saynète musicale, 1858
- La Nouvelle Hermione, comedy mingled with couplets, in 1 act, with Laurencin, 1858
- Il n'y a plus de grisettes !, vaudeville in 1 act, with Laurencin, 1859
- Le Masque de velours, vaudeville in 2 acts, 1859
- Les Trois fils de Cadet-Roussel, comédie-vaudeville in 3 acts, with Laurencin and Charles Varin, 1860
- Ah ! Que l'amour est agréable !, vaudeville in 5 acts, with Varin, 1860
- Un Hercule et une jolie femme, vaudeville in 1 act, with Varin, 1861
- Ma sœur Mirette, comedy in 2 acts, mingled with song, with Varin, 1861
- L'Auteur de la pièce, comédie-vaudeville in 1 act, with Varin, 1862
- Monsieur et Madame Denis, opéra comique in 1 act, with Laurencin, music by Jacques Offenbach, 1862
- La Comtesse Mimi, comedy in 3 acts, with Varin, 1862
- Un Ténor pour tout faire !, opérette in 1 act, with Varin, 1863
- Une Femme qui bat son gendre, comédie-vaudeville in 1 act, with Varin, 1864
- Une Femme, un melon et un horloger !, vaudeville in 1 act, with Varin, 1864
- Les Ficelles de Montempoivre, vaudeville in 3 acts, with Varin, 1864
- Les Filles mal gardées, comedy in 3 acts, with Varin, 1865
- Le Sommeil de l'innocence, comédie-vaudeville in 1 act, with Varin, 1865
- La Bande noire, drama in 7 acts, with Paul Foucher and Auguste Delaporte, 1866
- Le Baudet perdu, paysannerie in 1 act, with Varin, 1866
- Madame Ajax, play in 3 acts, with Varin, 1866
- L'Ange de mes rêves !, vaudeville in 3 acts, with Varin, 1867
- Ces Scélérates de bonnes, vaudeville in 3 acts, with Laurencin, 1867
- La Dame aux giroflées, comédie-vaudeville in 1 act, with Varin, 1867
- Le Dernier des Gaillard, vaudeville in 1 act, with Varin, 1867
- Madame Pot-au-feu, comédie-vaudeville in 1 act, with Varin, 1869

== Bibliography ==
- Jules Gay, Bibliographie des ouvrages relatifs à l'amour, aux femmes, au mariage..., 1871, (p. 447-448)
- Gustave Vapereau, Dictionnaire universel des contemporains, 1880, (p. 536)
- Charles Dezobry, Théodore Bachelet, Dictionnaire général de biographie et d'histoire, 1895, (p. 811)
