= Le vaisseau fantôme =

Opera

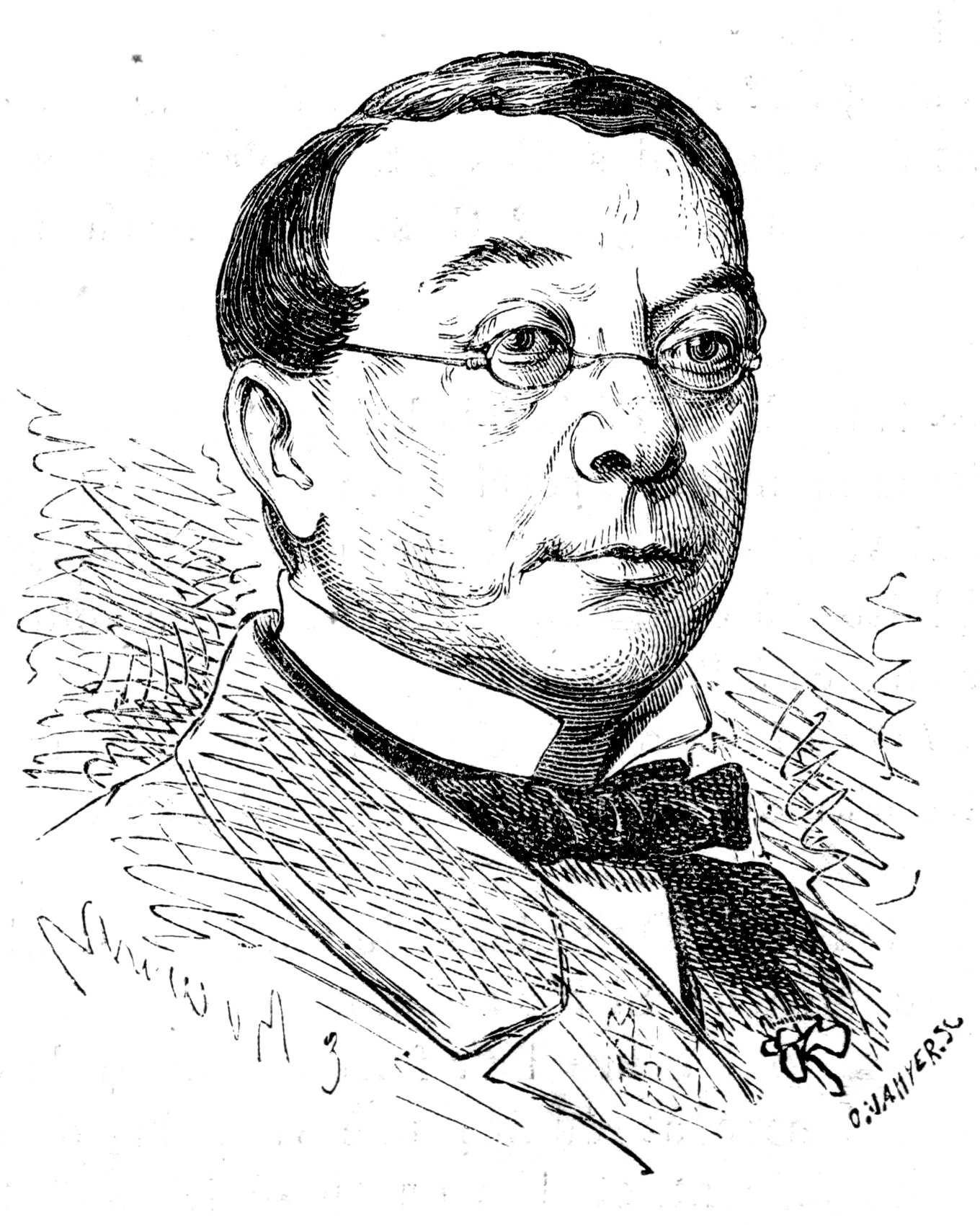
Pierre-Louis Dietsch, the composer

Le vaisseau fantôme ("The Phantom Ship") is an opera in two acts and three tableaux by Pierre-Louis Dietsch to a French libretto by Paul Foucher and Bénédict-Henry Révoil, based on Captain Marryat's novel The Phantom Ship, Sir Walter Scott's The Pirate, as well as tales by Heinrich Heine, James Fenimore Cooper, and Wilhelm Hauff. It was premiered on 9 November 1842 by the Paris Opera at the Salle Le Peletier and received 12 performances.

== Background ==
Richard Wagner had submitted a scenario, Le hollandais volant (later to become famous as the opera Der fliegende Holländer), to Léon Pillet, Director of the Paris Opera, for a future French language opera by himself. Although Pillet was interested, he determined to contract librettists Paul Foucher and Dietsch to create the work.

== Premiere ==
The sets were designed by Charles-Antoine Cambon and Humanité-René Philastre. The costumes were designed by Paul Lormier. According to Nicole Wild, the eponymous ship only appeared on the poster, and the spectators searched for it in vain.

== Roles ==
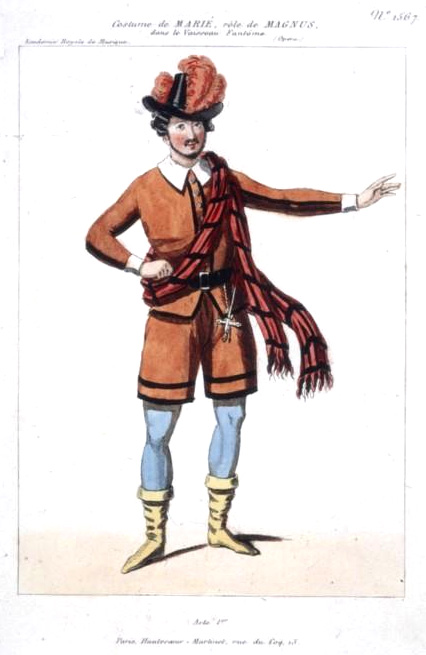
Costume design by Paul Lormier for Marié as Magnus

| Role | Voice type | Premiere Cast, 9 November 1842 (Conducted by François Habeneck) |
|---|---|---|
| Erik | tenor | Octave |
| Minna | soprano | Julie Dorus-Gras |
| Troil | baritone | Canaple |
| Magnus | baritone | Marié |
| Barlow | bass | Ferdinand Prévost |
| Schriften | bass | Saint-Denis |

== Synopsis ==
Place: Scotland
Time: Indefinite

=== Act 1 ===
Scene 1: A large hall in the home of Barlow in the Shetland Islands. The curtain rises on an evening soirée.

Scene 2: Village of Shetland, with the sea in the background. On the right side, Barlow's house with front steps.

=== Act 2 ===
A vast view of Shetland and the point of the island. A monastery on the left. A large boulder and the ship at anchor on the right in the background. A gloomy, turbulent sky with clouds.

== Recordings ==
In 2014 Naïve Records released a recording of the opera conducted by Marc Minkowski, coupled with the original version of Der fliegende Holländer. The cast included Sally Matthews as Minna, Bernhard Richter as Magnus, Eric Cutler as Erik and Russell Braun as Troil.

== Gallery ==
Set design sketches for Act 2 by Charles-Antoine Cambon

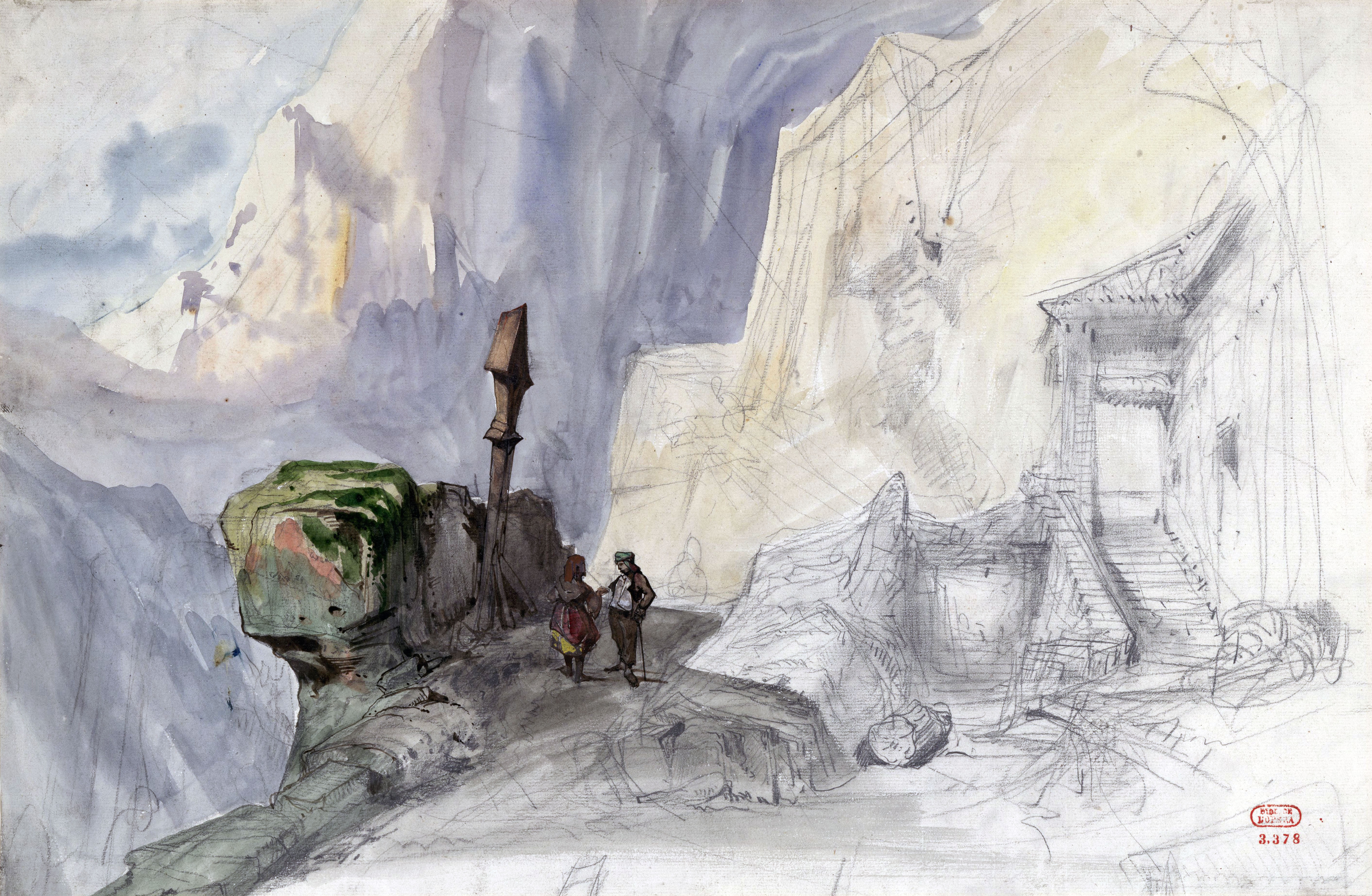
Cambon 121

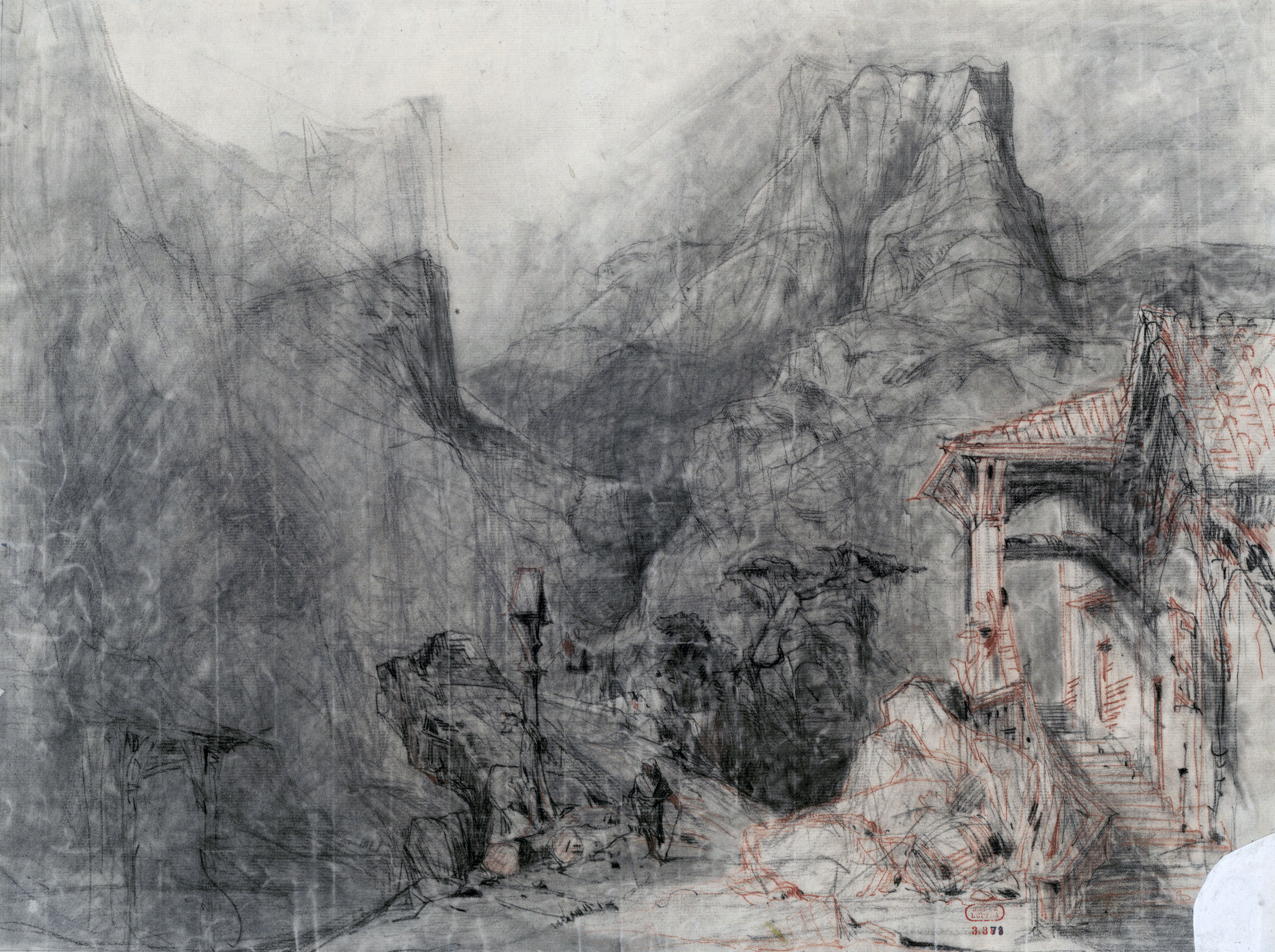
Cambon 122

== Bibliography ==
- Millington, Barry (1992). "Fliegende Holländer, Der", vol. 2, pp. 228–231, in The New Grove Dictionary of Opera, 4 volumes. London: Macmillan. ISBN 9781561592289.
- Wild, Nicole (1987). Décors et costumes du XIXe siècle. Tome I. Opéra de Paris, pp. 269–270. Paris: Bibliothèque nationale, Département de la Musique. ISBN 9782717717532.
