= Bibliography of Napoleon =

For his life and a basic reading list see Napoleon I of France.

Such list is far from exhaustive, a French specialist of Napoleon, Jean Tulard, considered by his peers "the master of Napoleonic studies", estimating in 2014 that there are some 80 000 books written about him, a number which rises constantly. Napoleon is among the most written-about figures in history; Jean Tulard noted that more books have been written about him than days have passed since his death.

== Major biographies ==
External videos
- Presentation by Steven Englund on Napoleon: A Political Life, April 13, 2004, C-SPAN
- Booknotes interview with Alan Schom on Napoleon Bonaparte, October 26, 1997, C-SPAN

- Asprey, Robert. The Rise of Napoleon Bonaparte and The Reign of Napoleon Bonaparte (2002); 2 vol., 1200pp; popular biography focusing on the military
- Thomas Hernault, Napoléon ou les vertus, Éd. La Simarre, Paris, 2025 ISBN 978-2365362245.
- Barnett, Corelli. Bonaparte (1978)
- Bell, David Avrom. Napoleon: A Concise Biography (2015)
- Broers, Michael. Napoleon: Soldier of Destiny (2014)
- Broers, Michael. Napoleon: The Spirit of the Age: 1805–1810 (2018)
- Broers, Michael. Napoleon: The Decline and Fall of an Empire: 1811–1821 (2022)
- Dwyer, Philip. Napoleon: The Path to Power (2008), to 1799
- Emsley, Clive. Napoleon 2003 142 pp, very succinct coverage of life, France and empire; little on warfare
- Cronin, Vincent. Napoleon (1971), favorable popular bio
- Dwyer, Philip. Napoleon: The Path to Power (2008), 672 pp; vol. 1 of major new biography, to 1799
- Ellis, Geoffry. Napoleon (1997)
- Englund, Steven. Napoleon: A Political Life (2004). 575 pages; the best (and most advanced) political biography in English; thin on military
- Falk, Avner. Napoleon Against Himself: A Psychobiography (2007) offers novel explanations for his many irrational, self-defeating, and self-destructive actions.
- Fisher, Herbert. Napoleon (1913) 256pp old classic online edition
- Fremont-Barnes, Gregory. Napoleon Bonaparte (2012)
- Fournier, August. Napoleon the First: A Biography (1903); 836 pages; excellent old biography online edition
- Herold, J. Christopher. The Age of Napoleon (1963) 480pp, popular history stressing empire and diplomacy
- Johnson, Paul. Napoleon: A Penguin Life (2002). 208 pp.
- Lefebvre, Georges: Napoleon, (2 vol. 1935; English translation 1969), influential but dated French perspective
- Markham, Felix (1963). Napoleon. Archived from the original on 2012-10-18 – via Questia.
- McLynn, Frank. Napoleon: A Biography (2003) 752pp, stress on military
- Roberts, Andrew. Napoleon: A Life (2014)
- Rose, Tom Holland. The Life of Napoleon I: Including New Materials from the British Official Records, (2 vol. 1903), old but solid scholarship; online edition vol. 2
- Thompson, J. M. Napoleon Bonaparte: His Rise and Fall (1954)
- Tulard, Jean. Napoleon: The Myth of the Saviour (1985), influential French biography
- Woloch, Isser. Napoleon and His Collaborators: the making of a dictatorship (2001)

== General reference ==
- Chandler, David. Dictionary of the Napoleonic Wars (1993)
- Esposito, Vincent J. and John R. Elting, A Military History and Atlas of the Napoleonic Wars (1999); textbook; includes the West Point maps
- Fremont-Barnes, Gregory. ed. The Encyclopedia of the French Revolutionary and Napoleonic Wars: A Political, Social, and Military History (ABC-CLIO: 3 vol. 2006)
- Furet, François and Mona Ozouf, eds. A Critical Dictionary of the French Revolution (1989), 1120pp; long essays by scholars; conservative perspective; stress on history of ideas
- Greiss, Thomas E. West Point Atlas for the Wars of Napoleon (1986) 70pp; all maps are online
- Nafziger, George F. Historical Dictionary of the Napoleonic Era. 2002. 353 pp.
- Nicholls, David. Napoleon: A Biographical Companion. 1999. 300 pp.
- Pope, Stephen. Dictionary of the Napoleonic Wars (2000). 572 pp.
- Smith, Digby. The Greenhill Napoleonic Wars Data Book (1998); 582pp; data on 2000+ individual battles, clashes, sieges, raids, capitulations, and naval engagements

== Military studies ==
External videos
- Presentation by Juan Cole on Napoleon's Egypt: Invading the Middle East, August 24, 2007, C-SPAN
- Booknotes interview with Andrew Roberts on Napoleon & Wellington, January 12, 2003, C-SPAN

- Adkin, Mark. The Waterloo Companion: The Complete Guide to History's Most Famous Land Battle (2002) 448pp excerpt and text search
- Arnold, James R. Napoleon Conquers Austria: The 1809 Campaign for Vienna (1995). 247 pp. excerpt and text search
- Bell, David A. The First Total War: Napoleon's Europe and the Birth of Warfare as We Know It (2008) excerpt and text search
- Chandler, David. The Campaigns of Napoleon: the Mind and Method of History's Greatest Soldier (1973), 1216 pp; experts call it the best military synthesis
- Cole, Juan. Napoleon's Egypt: Invading the Middle East (2007) excerpts and online search from Amazon.com
- Connelly, Owen. Blundering to Glory: Napoleon's Military Campaigns (2nd ed.; 2006) negative on Napoleon's skills
- Coote, Stephen. Napoleon and the Hundred Days (2005). 320 pp.
- Dodge, Theodore Ayrault. Napoleon; A History of the Art of War (1904), old classic online edition
- Duffy, Christopher. Austerlitz, 1805 (1999)
- Duffy, Christopher. Borodino and the War of 1812 (1999).
- Elting, John R. Swords Around a Throne: Napoleon's Grande Armée (1997), influential study
- Epstein, Robert M. Napoleon's Last Victory and the Emergence of Modern War (1994) on Austrian war of 1809
- Esdaile, Charles J. Napoleon's Wars: An International History, 1803–1815 (2008), 656pp excerpt and text search
- Esdaile, Charles J. (2001). The French Wars 1792–1815. Archived from the original on 2007-10-30 – via Questia.
- Fisher, Todd. The Napoleonic Wars (2001-4) 3 vol; 96pp, short, well-illustrated operational history excerpt and text search vol. 1; excerpt and text search vol. 2; excerpt and text search vol. 3
- Forrest, Alan. Napoleon's Men: The Soldiers of the Revolution and Empire. 2002. 248 pp.
- Fortescue, J. W. A history of the British army (19v 1899-1930) full text vol. 4 pt2: 1789–1801online edition vol. 6: 1807–1809; full text vol. 7: 1809–1810; full text vol. 8: 1810–1812; full text vol. 9: 1813–1814; full text vol. 10: 1814–1815
- Gates, David. The Napoleonic Wars, 1803–1815 (1997) 304pp; attacks Connolly and says N's "brilliance as a military commander has rarely been equalled let alone surpassed"
- Gill, John. With Eagles to Glory: Napoleon and His German Allies in the 1809 Campaign (1992)
- Goetz, Robert. 1805: Austerlitz; Napoleon and the Destruction of the Third Coalition (2005). 368pp
- Griffith, Paddy. The Art of War of Revolutionary France 1789–1802, (1998); 304 pp; excerpt and text search
- Hamilton-Williams, David. Waterloo: New Perspectives; The Great Battle Reappraised (1994). 416 pp. excerpt and text search
- Herold, J. Christopher. Napoleon in Egypt (1962) online edition
- Kagan, Frederick W. "Russia's Wars with Napoleon: 1805–1815", in The Military History of Tsarist Russia, ed. Frederick W. Kagan and Robin Higham (2002), 106–22.
- Kagan, Frederick W. The End of the Old Order: Napoleon And Europe, 1801–1805 (2006) first of four promised volumes; covers the strengths and strategies of all the powers excerpt and text search
- Leggiere, Michael V. Napoleon and Berlin: The Franco-Prussian War in North Germany, 1813. 2002. 384 pp. excerpt and text search
- Leggiere, Michael V. The Fall of Napoleon. Vol. 1: The Allied Invasion of France, 1813–1814 (2007) 690pp excerpt and text search
- Lieven, Dominic. "Russia and the Defeat of Napoleon (1812-14)". Kritika: Explorations in Russian and Eurasian History 2006 7(2): 283-308. ISSN 1531-023X Fulltext: in Project MUSE. Argues Alexander's successful strategy has been neglected
- Liaropoulos, Andrew N. "Revolutions in Warfare: Theoretical Paradigms and Historical Evidence—the Napoleonic and First World War Revolutions in Military Affairs". Journal of Military History 2006 70(2): 363–384. ISSN 0899-3718 Full text in Project MUSE.
- Lieven, Dominic. "Russia and the Defeat of Napoleon (1812–14)" Kritika: Explorations in Russian and Eurasian History 7#2 (2006) 283-308 online in Project MUSE
- Luvaas, Jay. Napoleon on the Art of War (2001) 288 pp. A synthesis, arrangement, and translation of Napoleon's thinking. excerpt and text search
- Lynn, John A. The Bayonets of the Republic: Motivation and Tactics in the Army of Revolutionary France, 1791–94 (1984); influential analysis excerpt and text search
- Muir, Rory. Tactics and the Experience of Battle in the Age of Napoleon (2000), 466pp excerpt and text search
- Nofi, Albert A. The Waterloo Campaign, June 1815. 1993. 333pp online edition
- Nosworthy, Brent. With Musket, Cannon and Sword: Battle Tactics of Napoleon and His Enemies (1996). 528 pp.
- Paret, Peter. "Napoleon and the Revolution of War", in Paret, ed. Makers of Modern Strategy (1986)
- Pericoli, Ugo. 1815: The Armies at Waterloo (1973)
- Riley, J. P. "How Good Was Napoleon?" History Today, (July 2007) 57#7 10pp in EBSCO
- Riley, J. P. Napoleon and the World War of 1813: Lessons in Coalition Warfighting (2000). 480 pp
- Riley, Jonathon. Napoleon As a General: Command from the Battlefield to Grand Strategy (2007)
- Roberts, Andrew. Napoleon & Wellington: The Battle of Waterloo and the Great Commanders Who Fought It (2001)
- Rogers, H.C.B. Napoleon's Army (1974)
- Rothenberg, Gunther E. (2006), The Napoleonic Wars 240pp, well illustrated synthesis by leading scholar excerpt and text search
- Rothenberg, Gunther. The Art of Warfare in the Age of Napoleon 1978
- Schneid, Frederick C. (2002). Napoleon's Italian Campaigns: 1805–1815. Archived from the original on 2012-10-18 – via Questia.
- Tarle, Eugene (1942). Napoleon's Invasion of Russia, 1812. Archived from the original on 2012-10-18 – via Questia.

== Impact on France ==
- Bergeron, Louis. France under Napoleon (1981), French viewpoint
- Forrest, Alan. "Propaganda and the Legitimation of Power in Napoleonic France". French History, 2004 18(4): 426-445. ISSN 0269-1191 Fulltext: in OUP journals
- Furet, François. The French Revolution, 1770–1814 (1996), pp 211–65 on Napoleon
- Furet, François and Mona Ozouf, eds. A Critical Dictionary of the French Revolution (1989), 1120pp; long essays by scholars; conservative perspective
- Goubert, Pierre. The Course of French History. 1991; French textbook; ch. 14 online edition
- Lyons, Martyn. Napoleon and the Legacy of the Revolution (1994)
- Paxton, John. Companion to the French Revolution (1987), hundreds of short entries.
- Scott, Samuel F. and Barry Rothaus. Historical Dictionary of the French Revolution, 1789-1799 (1984), short essays by scholars
- Sutherland, D.M.G. The French Revolution and Empire: The Quest for a Civic Order (2nd ed 2003), comprehensive survey
- Sutherland, D.M.G. France 1789–1815. Revolution and Counter-Revolution (2nd ed. 2003, 430pp) excerpts and online search from Amazon.com

== Diplomacy and impact on Europe ==
- Blanning, T.C.W. The French Revolutionary Wars 1787–1802 (1996).
- Broers, Michael. Europe under Napoleon 1799–1815 (1996) 291pp, covers everything except the battles
- Bruun, Geoffrey. Europe and the French Imperium, 1799–1814 1938. excellent survey of all of Europe
- Dwyer, Philip G. ed. Napoleon and Europe, (2001), essays by scholars on each major power
- Ellis, Geoffrey. The Napoleonic Empire (1991)
- Grab, Alexander. Napoleon and the Transformation of Europe (2003), pp. 249, maps; excellent synthesis excerpt and text search
- Hill, Peter P. Napoleon's Troublesome Americans: Franco-American Relations, 1804–1815 (2005)
- Lyons, Martyn. Napoleon and the Legacy of the Revolution (1994)
- Muir, Rory. Britain and the Defeat of Napoleon, 1807–1815 (1996). 466 pp.
- Parker, Harold T. "Why Did Napoleon Invade Russia? A Study in Motivation and the Interrelations of Personality and Social Structure", Journal of Military History 54 (April 1990): 131–46. JSTOR 1986039.
- Rothenberg, Gunther E. "The Origins, Causes, and Extension of the Wars of the French Revolution and Napoleon", Journal of Interdisciplinary History, Vol. 18, No. 4, (Spring, 1988), pp. 771–793. JSTOR 204824.
- Rude, George F. and Harvey J. Kaye. Revolutionary Europe, 1783–1815 (2000), scholarly survey
- Schroeder, Paul W. "Napoleon's Foreign Policy: A Criminal Enterprise", Journal of Military History 54 (April 1990): 147–62. Highly negative
- Schroeder, Paul (1996). The Transformation of European Politics, 1763–1848. Archived from the original on 2012-10-18 – via Questia. Elaborate detail; advanced history; very hostile to Napoleon; online edition.
- Woolf, Stuart (1991). Napoleon's Integration of Europe. Archived from the original on 2012-10-18 – via Questia.
- Cambridge Modern History (1907) vol. 9: Napoleon online edition, older articles by scholars, 900pp

== Historiography and memory ==
External videos
- Tour of Napoleonic Era documents in the Special Collections and Archives of the Robert Manning Strozier Library at Florida State University, February 20, 2014, C-SPAN

- Black, Jeremy. "Why the French Failed: New Work on the Military History of French Imperialism 1792–1815". European History Quarterly 2000 30(1): 105-115. ISSN 0265-6914 Fulltext: in Sage journals
- Datta, Venita. "'L'appel Au Soldat': Visions of the Napoleonic Legend in Popular Culture of the Belle Epoque". French Historical Studies 2005 28(1): 1-30. ISSN 0016-1071
- Dunne, John (1997). "Napoleon: For or against ... and Beyond". History Review (27): 17+. Archived from the original on 2009-11-30 – via Questia.
- Dwyer, Philip G. "Napoleon Bonaparte as Hero and Saviour: Image, Rhetoric and Behaviour in the Construction of a Legend", French History 2004 18(4): 379-403,
- Forrest, Robert F. "Rumor into Myth: the Image of Napoleon among the Romanians, 1800–1848", Consortium on Revolutionary Europe 1750–1850: Proceedings 1992 21: 98-105
- Geyl, Pieter (1949). Napoleon: For and Against. Archived from the original on 2012-10-18 – via Questia. Debates among scholars.
- Hazareesingh, Sudhir. The Legend of Napoleon (2005) excerpt and text search
- Hazareesingh, Sudhir. "Memory and Political Imagination: the Legend of Napoleon Revisited". French History, 2004 18(4): 463–483. ISSN 0269-1191 Fulltext: in Oxford UP
- Hazareesingh, Sudhir. "Bonapartist Memory and Republican Nation-building: Revisiting the Civic Festivities of the Second Empire", Modern & Contemporary France 2003 11(3): 349-364
- Heit, Siegfried. "German Romanticism: an Ideological Response to Napoleon", Consortium on Revolutionary Europe 1750–1850: Proceedings 1980 1: 187–197. Argues that German opposition to Napoleon led German Romanticism to reject the chief ideals represented by the French Revolution and Napoleon. Uses the works of Arndt, Fichte, Jahn, Kleist, and Schleiermacher, to show how German Romanticism became identified with political reaction and nationalism, and how it opposed political liberalism, rationalism, neoclassicism, and cosmopolitanism.
- Horward, Donald D. "Napoleon and Beethoven", Consortium on Revolutionary Europe 1750–1850: Proceedings 1980 2: 3-13,
- Markham, J. David. "Napoleon and the Romantic Poets", Consortium on Revolutionary Europe 1750–1850: Selected Papers 1998: 651-663,
- Newman, Edgar Leon. "Defanging the Revolution: How the Memory of the French Revolution Was Changed in French Working-class Poetry and Song, 1830–52", Consortium on Revolutionary Europe 1750–1850: Selected Papers 1995: 591-605,
- Nieuwazny, Andrzej. "Napoleon and Polish Identity". History Today, May 1998 v48 n5 pp. 50–55
- O'Brien, David. After the Revolution: Antoine-Jean Gros, Painting and Propaganda under Napoleon (2006) 288p.
- Prendergast, Christopher (1997). Napoleon and History Painting: Antoine-Jean Gros's La Bataille d'Eylau. Oxford: Clarendon Press. ISBN 0-19-817422-5.
- Pinkney, David. ed., Napoleon: Historical Enigma (1969)
- Schönpflug, Daniel. "So Far, and Yet So Near: Comparison, Transfer and Memory in Recent German Books on the Age of the French Revolution and Napoleon", French History 2004 18(4): 446-462
- Stock, Paul. "Imposing on Napoleon: the Romantic Appropriation of Bonaparte", Journal of European Studies 2006 36(4): 363–388, deals with English Romantic writers
- Wilson-Smith, Timothy. Napoleon and His Artists (1996)
