= Eric Cutler =

American opera singer

Eric Cutler is an American tenor notable for his performances of bel canto repertoire and Mozart operas in particular. He is a native of Adel, Iowa, and a graduate of Luther College. Cutler is an alumnus of the Metropolitan Opera Lindemann Young Artist Development Program and was a winner of the Metropolitan Opera National Council Auditions in 1998. He won the Richard Tucker Award in 2005.

== Career ==
Cutler made his role debut as Gounod's Roméo at Opera Australia and has since performed Nadir in Bizet's Les pêcheurs de perles there. In 2008 he returned to Opera Australia for another role debut, Edgardo in Donizetti's Lucia di Lammermoor, conducted by Richard Bonynge.

Cutler made his Metropolitan Opera debut as the First Prisoner in Beethoven's Fidelio in a Jürgen Flimm production conducted by James Levine. He has since performed there many times in such roles as Tamino in Mozart's The Magic Flute and Andres in Wozzeck (both under Levine). Cutler sang the role of Arturo opposite Anna Netrebko in the Met's revival of Bellini's I puritani conducted by Patrick Summers.

He sang the role of the Shepherd in a controversial production of Szymanowski's King Roger at the Opéra National de Paris in June 2009. He performed the Duke of Mantua in Verdi's Rigoletto, in a Fenice production, for a tour in Italy which involved Reggio Emilia and Venice.

== Mozart Roles ==
Cutler's most critically acclaimed performances have all been in Mozart operas. These include Tamino (Metropolitan Opera, Opera Theatre of St. Louis, Glyndebourne and Edinburgh Festivals), Belmonte in The Abduction from the Seraglio (Boston Lyric Opera, Houston Grand Opera and Teatro Real Madrid) and Don Ottavio in Don Giovanni (Wolf Trap Opera Company and Santa Fe Opera).

== Recordings ==
EMI issued Eric Cutler's first solo recording featuring songs of Barber, Schumann, Hahn and Liszt, called "Lieder Recital" with pianist Bradley Moore. Opera News included it as an "Editor's Choice" in 2004. In 2014 Naïve released a notable recording of the original version of Wagner's Der fliegende Holländer (with Cutler singing Georg) and the first recording of Le Vaisseau fantôme by Dietsch (Cutler singing Erik), conducted by Marc Minkowski.
