= Sally Matthews =

British operatic soprano (born 1975)

Sally Helanna Matthews (born July 1975) is a British operatic soprano.

== Early life ==
She was born in Southampton; her father was an aspiring popular musician. She recalls that, coming from a musical family, she "sang constantly just to pass the time. When I was ten, I started studying with Cynthia Jolly, who had a career as a singer and later became a writer". Studies with Jolly continued until she was 18, and later her teacher at the Guildhall School of Music and Drama was Johanna Peters, although her technique was already set.

She attended The Gregg School, a local independent school. She went to the Guildhall School of Music and Drama.

Andrew Porter noted in Opera that her rendition of 'O mio babbino caro' in a Guildhall School performance, was "with pure timbre, emotional phrasing, and a swell that would break a heart of stone".

== Career ==
She made her professional debut at the Royal Opera House in January 2001 as Nannetta in Verdi's Falstaff conducted by Bernard Haitink. In this acclaimed Royal Opera House debut she stood in for a colleague; Haitink counselled her to "be very careful about what you do ...and take care of your voice", advice which she took seriously. She trained under the house's Young Artist Programme from 2001-2003.

She made her BBC Proms debut in 2001 in Vaughan Williams' Serenade to Music, performing with the BBC Symphony Orchestra conducted by Leonard Slatkin.

She was a member of the BBC Radio 3 New Generation Artists scheme from 2002-2004. She played Josephine in the acclaimed BBC Proms version of H.M.S Pinafore.

Roles include Alice in Unsuk Chin’s Alice in Wonderland at its 2007 premiere at the Bayerische Staatsoper, title roles in Handel’s Deidamia (Netherlands Opera) and Cavalli’s La Calisto, Anne Trulove, Blanche in Dialogues des Carmélites, the Governess in The Turn of the Screw and Fiordiligi and Jenůfa. For her Metropolitan Opera debut in 2017 she sang Silvia in Thomas Adès’s The Exterminating Angel.

In 2014, Naïve released the first-ever recording of Le Vaisseau fantôme by Dietsch, conducted by Marc Minkowski with Matthews as Minna. Other recordings by Matthews include Schubert and Strauss lieder, Der Freischütz under Colin Davis and Carmina Burana with the Berlin Philharmonic under Simon Rattle.

She is married to the Icelandic tenor Finnur Bjarnason, director of the Icelandic National Opera.
