= Ferdinand Prévôt =

French operatic baritone

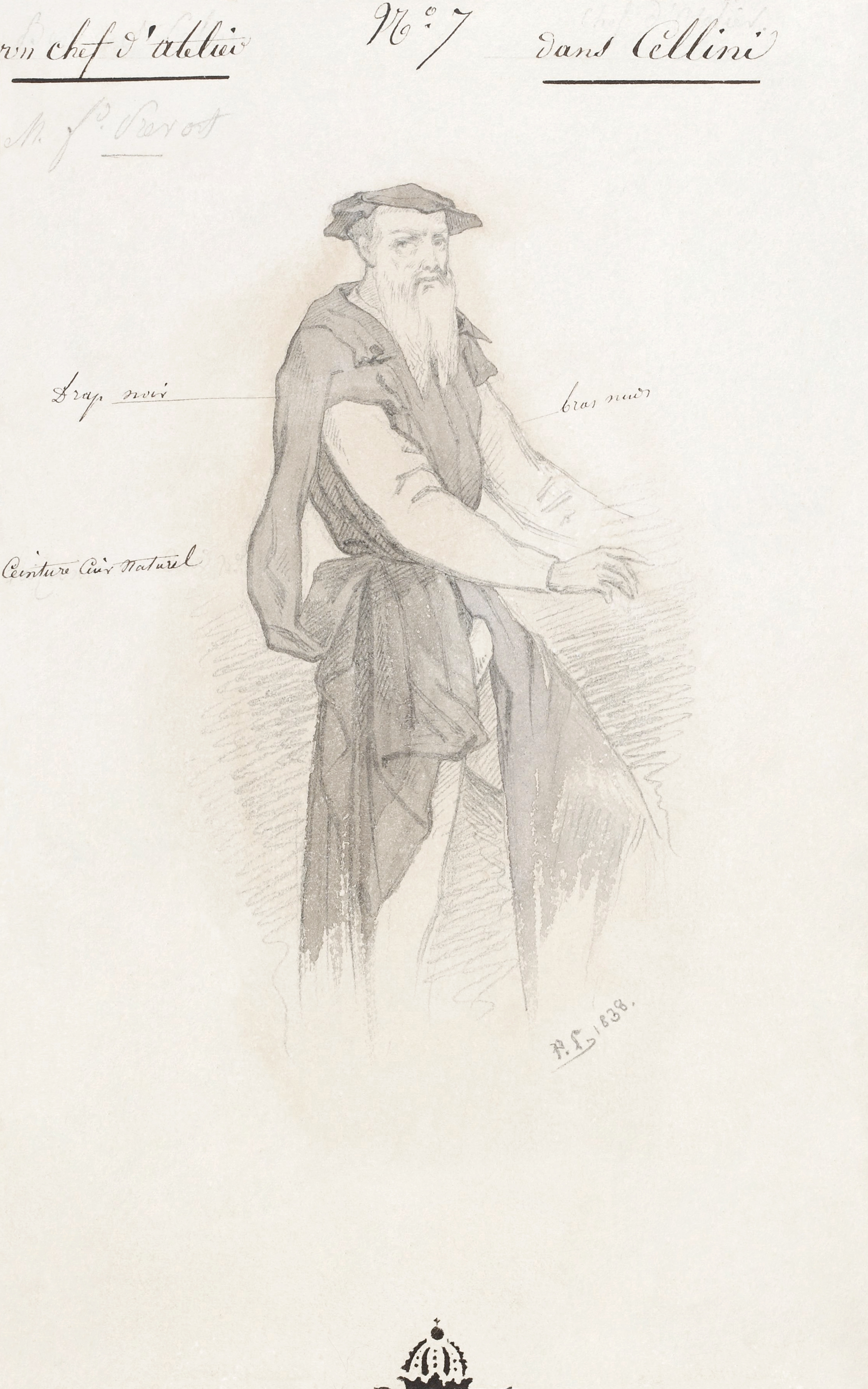
The design for Prévôt's costume as Bernardino in Berlioz's Benvenuto Cellini

Ferdinand Prévôt (2 May 1800 – 11 June 1879) was a French operatic bass-baritone. His surname is also found spelled as Prevot or Prévost.

He was born Pierre-Ferdinand Prévôt in Caussade (Tarn-et-Garonne). He studied at the Paris Conservatory, winning the first prize in vocalisation and second prize in chant in 1823.

The son of a singer, he appeared in the Paris Opéra chorus in 1818. He made his debut as a soloist in Grétry's Anacréon chez Polycrate on 15 March 1824. He enjoyed a long career creating a number of minor roles in important operas. He sometimes sang in the same performances with his son Alexis Prévôt (a bass) and/or Alexandre Prévôt (also a bass). Since first names are sometimes not given in the sources, it is not always possible to determine which singer is meant.

Prévôt retired in 1857 and died in Vulaines in 1879.

== Roles created ==
- Adam in the revised version of La mort d'Abel by Rodolphe Kreutzer, 17 March 1823
- Omar in Le siège de Corinthe by Gioachino Rossini, 9 October 1826
- 4th Knight in Le comte Ory by Gioachino Rossini, 20 August 1828
- Aufide in Moïse et Pharaon (French version of Mosè in Egitto) by Gioachino Rossini, 26 March 1827
- Selva in La muette de Portici by Daniel Auber, 29 February 1828
- Leuthold in William Tell by Gioachino Rossini, 3 August 1829
- Armfelt in Gustave III by Daniel Auber, 27 February 1833
- First man of the people in La Juive by Fromental Halévy, 23 February 1835
- Méru in Les Huguenots by Giacomo Meyerbeer, 29 February 1836
- Téobaldo in Guido et Ginevra by Halévy, 5 March 1838
- Bernardino in Benvenuto Cellini by Hector Berlioz, 10 September 1838
- Fritz in Le lac des fées by Daniel Auber, 1 April 1839
- Herald of arms in La reine de Chypre by Halévy, 22 December 1841
- Barlow in Le vaisseau fantôme by Louis Dietsch, 9 November 1842

== Sources ==
- Jullien, Adolphe (1888). Hector Berlioz: Sa Vie et ses oeuvres (in French). Paris: Librairie de l'Art. View at Google Books.
- Kutsch, K. J., Riemens, Leo (2003). Großes Sängerlexikon (fourth edition, in German). Munich: K. G. Saur. ISBN 9783598115981.
- Pierre, Constant, editor (1900). Le Conservatoire national de musique et de déclamation. Documents historiques et administratifs. Paris: Imprimerie National. 1031 pages. View at Google Books.
- Shulmann, Laurie C (1992), 'Prévôt, Ferdinand' in The New Grove Dictionary of Opera, edited by Stanley Sadie (London) ISBN 0333734327.
