= Pissy-Pôville =

- Commune
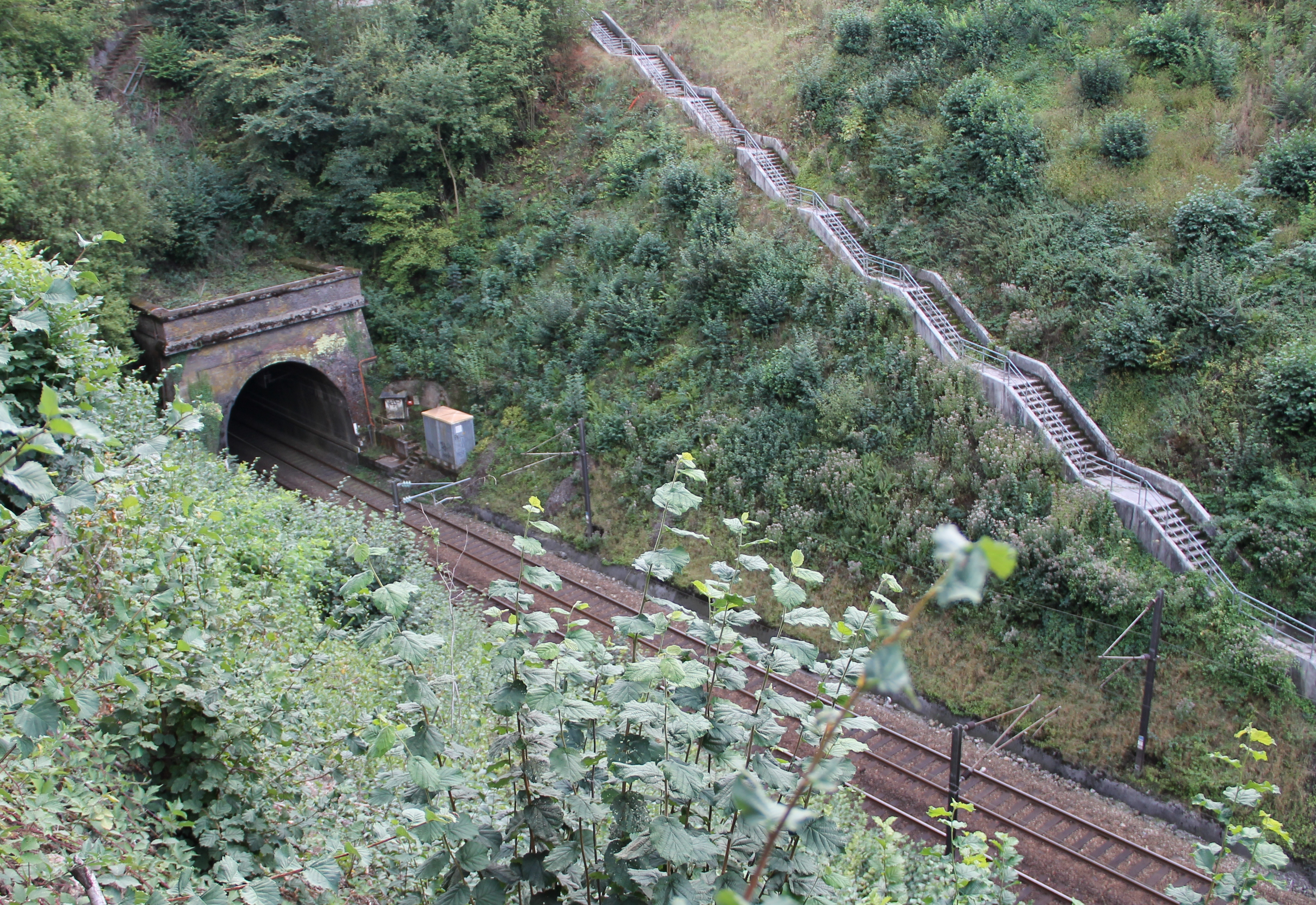
- A railway tunnel in Pissy-Pôville
- Location of Pissy-Pôville
- Location within France Location within Normandy
- Coordinates: 49°31′46″N 0°59′38″E
- Country: France
- Region: Normandy
- Department: Seine-Maritime
- Arrondissement: Rouen
- Canton: Notre-Dame-de-Bondeville

Government
  - Mayor (2026–32): Paul Lesellier
- Area^{1}: 11.26 km^{2} (4.35 sq mi)
- Elevation: 120 m (390 ft)
- Highest elevation: 144 m (472 ft)
- Lowest elevation: 47 m (154 ft)
- Population (2023): 1,276
  - Density: 113.3/km^{2} (293.5/sq mi)
- Time zone: UTC+01:00 (CET)
  - Summer (DST): UTC+02:00 (CEST)
- INSEE/Postal code: 76503 /76360
- ^{1} French Land Register data, which excludes lakes, ponds, glaciers > 1 km^{2} (0.386 sq mi or 247 acres) and river estuaries.

Pissy-Pôville (French pronunciation: [pisi povil]) is a commune in the Seine-Maritime department in the Normandy region in northern France. The 19th-century historian Théodore Bachelet (1820–1879) was born in this village.

== Geography ==
A farming village situated approximately 9 miles (14 km) northwest of Rouen, at the junction of the D6015, D47 and the D104 roads. The A151 autoroute passes through the commune's territory.

== History ==
The commune was formed in 1822 through the merger of the historic settlements of Pissy and Pôville. Pissy was known as Piscei in 1006, Pisciacus around 1025, and Pissei in 1040. Pôville was recorded as Povilla between 1185 and 1207; as Ecclesia de Pouvilla around 1240; Poovilla in 1337; Poville in 1319 and in 1431; Porville in 1460; and Poville again in 1526 and 1527.

== Population ==
Historical population
Year	Pop.	±% p.a.
1968	568	—
1975	683	+2.67%
1982	947	+4.78%
1990	1,089	+1.76%
1999	1,256	+1.60%
2007	1,284	+0.28%
2012	1,248	−0.57%
2017	1,264	+0.26%
2023	1,276	+0.16%
Source: INSEE

== Places of interest ==
- The church of St. Martin, dating from the thirteenth century.
- A sixteenth century manorhouse with a dovecote.
- Traces of a Roman villa.

== See also ==
- Communes of the Seine-Maritime department
