= Élie Berthet =

French novelist (1815–1891)

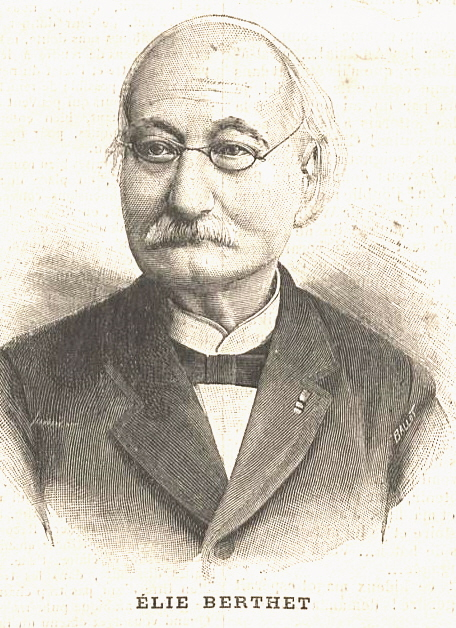

Élie Berthet (8 June 1815 - 3 February 1891) was a French novelist.

== Biography ==
Berthet was born in Limoges. A most prolific writer, he wrote more than 100 novels about Paris, criminal affairs, the prehistoric world, and other subjects. His Les Houilleurs de Polignies is reported to have been one of the inspirations for Zola's Germinal. He died, aged 75, in Paris.

== Works ==
- La Veilleuse (recueil de récits, published under the penname Élie Raymond) (1835)
- Le Pacte de famine (drama, with Paul Foucher) (1839)
- Les Garçons de recette (drama, with Adolphe d'Ennery) (1840)
- L'Ami du château (with Henry Monnier) (1841)
- Le Colporteur (1841)
- La Croix de l'affût (1841)
- Le Chevalier de Clermont (with Henry Monnier) (1841)
- Justin (1842)
- Val d'Andorre (1842)
- La Belle Drapière (1843)
- Richard Le Fauconnier (1844)
- La Ferme de l'Oseraie (1846)
- Château de Montbrun (1847)
- La Fille du cabanier (1847)
- Le Pacte de famine (roman) (1847)
- Paul Duvert (1848)
- Le Château d'Auvergne (1848)
- Une maison de Paris (1848)
- La Mine d'or (1849)
- L'Étang de Précigny (1849)
- Le Roi des ménétriers (1850)
- Antonia (1850)
- Le Val-perdu (1851)
- La Falaise Saint-Honorine (1851)
- La Fille des Pyrénées (1851)
- Les Mésaventures de Michel Morin (1851)
- La Roche tremblante (1851)
- Le Réfractaire (1852)
- La Malédiction de Paris (1852)
- Le Vallon suisse (1852)
- La Bastide rouge (1853)
- Cadet de Normandie (1853)
- La Ferme de La Borderie (1853)
- Le Garçon de banque (1853)
- Le Marquis de Norville (1853)
- Les Missionnaires du Paraguay (1853)
- Les Mystères de La Famille (1853)
- Les Catacombes de Paris (1854)
- Le Garde-chasse (1854)
- Gaëtan le Savoyard (1855)
- Justine (1855)
- La Maison murée (1855)
- Le Spectre de Châtillon (1855)
- La Mère du notaire (1856)
- Les Chauffeurs (1857)
- Le Nid de Cigognes (1857)
- La Bête du Gévaudan (1858)
- La Dryade de Clairefont (1859)
- Les Émigrans : la colonie du Kansas (1859)
- Le Douanier de mer (1860)
- Le Dernier Irlandais (1860)
- La Directrice des postes (1861)
- L'Homme des bois (1861)
- L'Aveugle-né (1862)
- Le Gentilhomme verrier (1862)
- Odilia (1863)
- L'Oiseau du désert (1863)
- Le Capitaine Blaugis (1864)
- Le Fou de St.-Didier (1864)
- Le Juré (1864)
- La Double Vue (1865)
- L'Enfant des bois (1865)
- Le Fermier Reber (1865)
- La Maison des Deux Sœurs (1865)
- Les Houilleurs de Polignies (1866)
- La Peine de mort ou La Route du mal (1866)
- Le Bon Vieux Temps (1867)
- Le Démon de La Chasse (1868)
- Les Drames de Cayenne (1868)
- Le Séquestré (1869)
- La Tour du télégraphe (1869)
- Le Gouffre (1872)
- L'Année du grand hiver 1709 (1873)
- L'Incendiaire (1873)
- L'Œil de diamant (1873)
- Les Parisiennes à Nouméa (1873)
- Le Capitaine Rémy (1874)
- Les Drames du cloître (1874)
- Les Oreilles du banquier (1874)
- La Famille Savigny (1875)
- Maître Bernard (1875)
- Les Crimes inconnus (1876)
- Romans Préhistoriques (1876)
- L'Assassin du percepteur (1877)
- Le Braconnier (1877)
- Le Juré assassin (1877)
- Mlle. de La Fougeraie (1877)
- M. de Blangy et Les Riupert (1877)
- Le Sauvage (1877)
- Tout est bien qui finit bien (1877)
- Les Trois spectres (1877)
- Histoire des uns et des autres (1878)
- Les Cagnards de l'Hôtel-Dieu de Paris (1879)
- Le Crime de Pierrefitte (1879)
- Les Crimes du sorcier (1879)
- Les Petites Écolières dans les cinq parties du monde (1880)
- La Fontaine et La Fidélité (1880)
- Un mariage secret (1880)
- Le Martyre de La Boscotte (1880)
- Mère et fille (1880)
- Une mystérieuse aventure (1880)
- Le Charlatan (1881)
- Tête-à-l'envers (1881)
- La Bonne femme (1882)
- Le Marchand de tabac (1882)
- Le Sac de Loramée (1882)
- Fleur de Bohême (1883)
- La Sœur du curé (1883)
- Le Brocanteur (1884)
- La Femme du fou (1884)
- Paris avant l'histoire (1884)
- Édouard chez Les Orangs (1885)
- La Famille Rupert (1885)
- Le Garde-Champêtre (1885)
- L'Herboriste Nicias (1886)
- La Maison du malheur (1886)
- Les Petits écoliers dans les cinq parties du monde (1887)
- L'Expérience du grand-papa (1887)
- La Petite Chailloux (1888)
- Le Murier blanc ; le chasseur de marmottes (1890)
- Sœur Julie (1890)
