= Paul Foucher =

French writer (1810–1875)

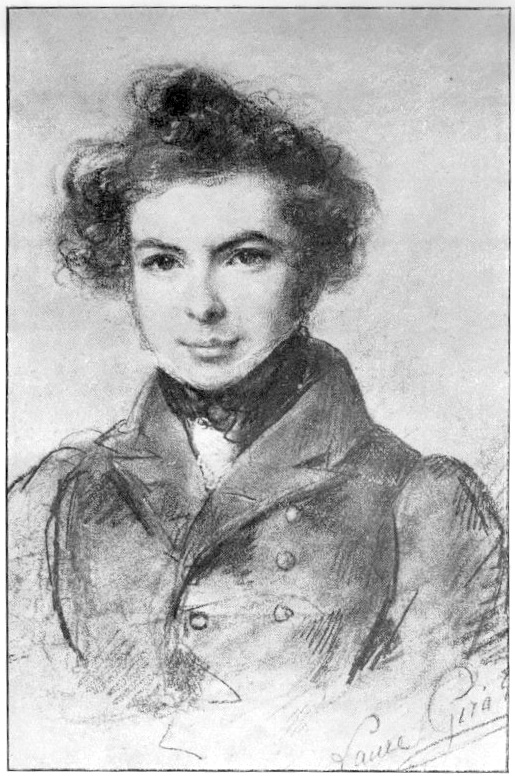
Paul Foucher

Paul-Henri Foucher (21 April 1810 – 24 January 1875) was a French playwright, theatre and music critic, political journalist, and novelist.

== Biography ==
=== Early career ===
Foucher was born in Paris and began his career as an employee in the offices of the War Department. One day he visited the poet Alexandre Soumet, who asked Foucher whether he had read his brother-in-law's play Amy Robsart. (Foucher's older sister Adèle had married Victor Hugo in 1822.) "If you have not read it, there are some fine scenes in it." Later Foucher asked Hugo if he could look at the play, and Hugo, who had been planning to burn it, instead gave it to Foucher and consented to let him revise it. Hugo had written the first three acts himself at the age of nineteen. He had then shown it to Soumet, who had disliked it, so Hugo had given his approval for Soumet to alter and finish it. The play combined comedy and tragedy, and Foucher, under the influence of the enormous success of Shakespeare as recently performed in Paris, revised it further and produced it under his own name in 1829, but it was such a complete failure, that Hugo "came forward and avowed his own share in the production, taking responsibility of the non-success." Nevertheless, the whole affair did gain the young Foucher some notability. The play was never published, although Hugo gave the manuscript to Alexandre Dumas, père, "who had it for a long time in his possession."

=== Career as a dramatist ===
Foucher soon obtained employment as a journalist and proceeded to write a new play, Yseul Raimbaud, which was first presented at the Théâtre de l'Odéon on 17 November 1830. It was attacked by the classiques (as the opponents of romanticism were then called), "but all agreed that there was talent and vigor in it. From that time the author's success was assured."

He rapidly showed himself to be imaginative and prolific, producing in quick succession Saynètes (1832), La Misère dans l'Amour (1832), and Les Passions dans le Monde (1833). As The New York Times was later to write: "Few literary men have been so active, or made so good a use of their time." His play Don Sébastien de Portugal, first produced at the Théâtre de la Porte Saint-Martin on 9 November 1838, was the inspiration for Eugène Scribe's libretto for Gaetano Donizetti's 1843 French grand opera Dom Sébastien. Herbert Weinstock, in his biography of Donizetti, has speculated that Foucher in turn may have been influenced by John Dryden's 1690 tragicomedy Don Sebastian. Foucher also contributed libretti for several operas and ballets, which "were not always impressive successes," but some for the Paris Opera "revealed a lively imagination and a feeling for the picturesque situations dear to the audiences of his time." These included Pierre-Louis Dietsch's opera Le Vaisseau fantôme (9 November 1842), Adolphe Adam's opera Richard en Palestine (7 October 1844), Edouard Deldevez's ballet-pantomime Paquita (a collaboration with Joseph Mazilier, who also did the choreography, first performed on 1 April 1846), and Count Nicolas Gabrielli's pantomime-ballet L'Étoile de Messine (20 November 1861). Most of Foucher's dramatic works were written in collaboration with well-known authors including Mazilier, D'Ennery, Arvers, Anicet-Bourgeois, Berthet, Goubaux, Desnoyers, Lavergne, Régnier, Borri, Jarry, Herbin, Bouchardy, Duport, Delaporte, Alboize, and Jaime.

=== Career as a journalist and writer of nonfiction ===
In 1848 he began to engage in politics, becoming the Paris correspondent for L'Indépendance belge in Brussels. His submissions were "very remarkable" and "full of life and spirit, and also full of information." He also became a noted theatre and music critic, first for L'Opinion nationale, for which he later wrote a Monday column entitled "Revue dramatique et lyrique", then for La France in 1865, and finally for La Presse. "After Jules Janin he was the critic who was most respected and feared." Many of his reviews were collected and published in 1867 in book form as Entre cour et jardin: études et souvenirs du théâtre (Between Court and Garden: Studies and Recollections of the Theatre). In 1873 he published a collection of sketches of famous dramatists as Les Coulisses du passé (In the Wings of the Past) and the book Les Sièges héroiques (Heroic Sieges), which tells the stories of celebrated sieges from the liberation of Orléans by Joan of Arc in 1429 to the bombardment of Strasbourg in 1870.

=== Career as a novelist ===
Foucher published two serialized novels in La France and L'Opinion nationale. These were later published in book form: Le Guetteur de Cordouan (The Watchman of Cordouan) in 1853, and La Vie du plaisir (The Life of Pleasure) in 1860.

=== Personal traits ===
Foucher had several distinctive personal traits. He was so near-sighted, that in Paris he became a standard for comparison: myope comme Paul Foucher. His handwriting was so bad that the journals at which he worked had to employ a special copyist whose sole job was to carry out "Foucher translations". And he was notoriously absent-minded. Once he attended a ball thrown by the Turkish Ambassador, Ve'ly-Pasha. When it came time to leave, he searched his pockets for his coat-check number, but could not find it. The cloak-room attendant was unable to help him, so as the evening wore on Foucher requested the help of three Turkish guests in turn, each more decorated and high-ranking than the previous, but all without success. Finally the attendant said: ""You are a regular nightmare, you had better sit down and wait." Still without his coat at daybreak, Foucher finally decided to go home, where at last he discovered his coat and realized why he had lost his number. Many such stories were told about Foucher, "who took them all amiably and kindly."

Foucher was named Chevalier of the Legion of Honor on 29 April 1847. He died in Paris and was buried at Montparnasse Cemetery. Victor Hugo followed the hearse on foot, until eventually the acclamations of the crowds of the Quartier Latin forced him to retire to one of the mourning coaches. According to The New York Times, due to Foucher's "incessant labor", he "left his family in comfortable circumstances."

== Works ==
=== Plays ===
- Yseul Raimbaud (1830)
- Saynètes (1832)
- La Misère dans l'Amour (1832)
- Les Passions dans le Monde (1833)
- Caravage (1834)
- Jeanne de Naples (1837)
- Don Sébastien de Portugal, tragédie (1839)
- Les Chevaux du Carrousel (1839)
- Le Pacte de famine (with Élie Berthet) (1839)
- Bianca Contadini (1840)
- La Guerre de l'indépendance en Amérique (1840)
- La Voisin (1842)
- Les Deux Perles (1844)
- Les Étouffeurs de Londres (1847)
- L'Héritier du Czar (1849)
- Notre-Dame de Paris (1850)
- Mademoiselle Aïssé (1854)
- La Bonne Aventure (1854)
- La Joconde (1855)
- Les Rôdeurs du Pont-Neuf (1858)
- L'Amiral de l'escadre Bleue (1858)
- L'Institutrice (1861)
- Delphine Gerbet (1862)
- Le Carnaval de Naples (1864)
- La Bande Noire (1866)

=== Operas and ballets-pantomimes ===
- Le Vaisseau fantôme, music by Dietsch (1842)
- Richard en Palestine, music by Adam (1844)
- Paquita, music by Deldevez (1846)
- L'Opéra au camp, music by Varney (1854)
- L'Étoile de Messine, music by Gabrielli (1861)

=== Serialized novels ===
- Le Guetteur du Cordouan (1854, 3 vol.)
- La Vie de plaisir (1860)

=== Nonfiction works ===
- Entre cour et jardin: études et souvenirs du théâtre (1867)
- Les Coulisses du passé (1873)
- Les Sièges héroïques (1873)
