= Gaston de Montheau =

French playwright and poet

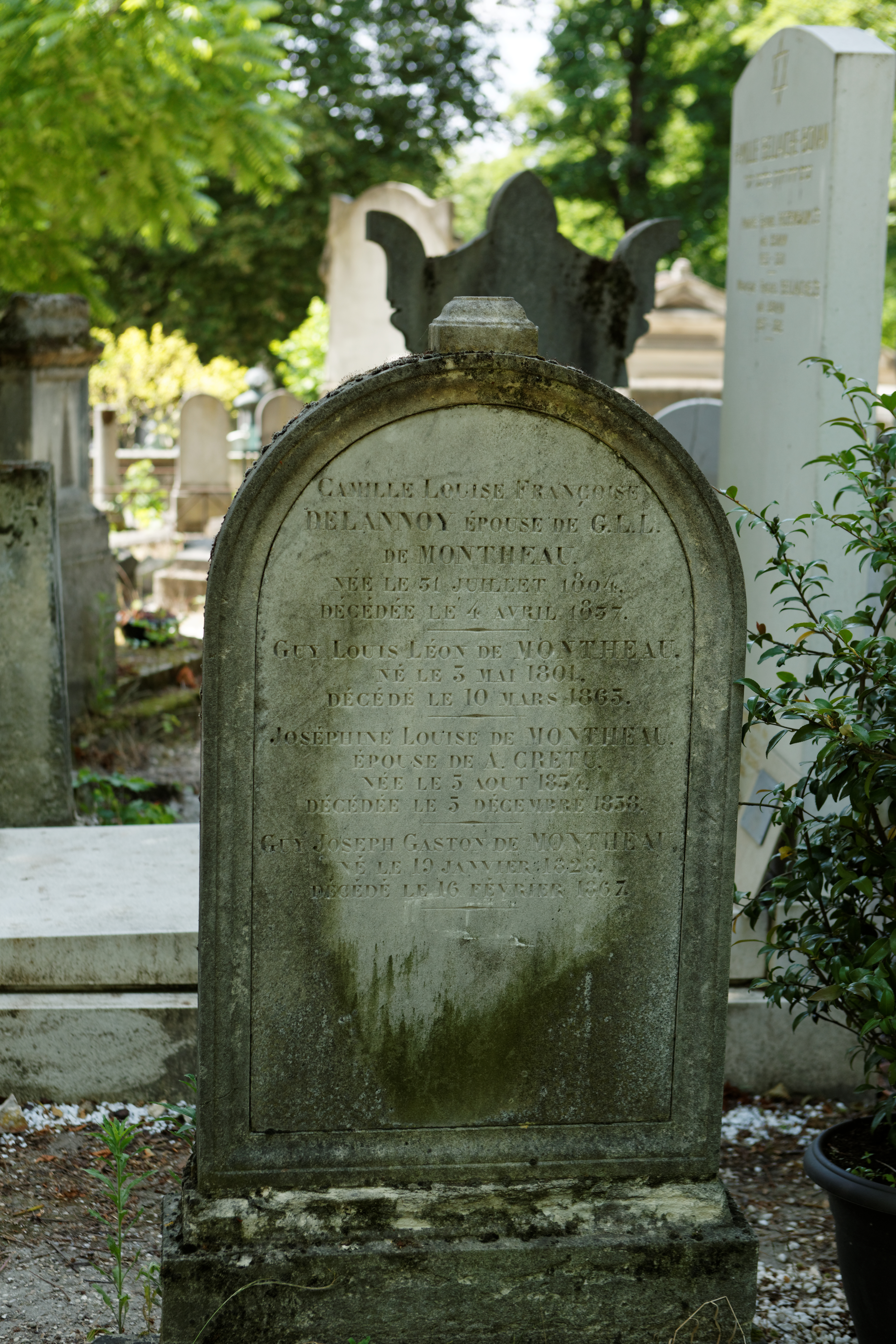
- Gaston de Montheau's grave at the Père Lachaise Cemetery (25th division)
- Born: 19 January 1828; Paris, France
- Died: 16 February 1867 (aged 39); Paris, France
- Occupations: playwright, poet

Gaston de Montheau, full name Guy Joseph Gaston de Montheau, (19 January 1828 – 16 February 1867) was a 19th-century French playwright and poet.

His plays were presented on the most significant Parisian stages of the 19th century including the Théâtre des Variétés, Théâtre de la Gaîté, Théâtre du Vaudeville, Théâtre-Français. He is buried in Père Lachaise cemetery (division 25), in Paris.

== Works ==
- Passe-temps de duchesse, comedy in 1 act, in prose
- 1851: La Course au plaisir, revue of the year 1851, in 2 acts and 3 tableaux, with Michel Delaporte and Théodore Muret
- 1851: Mignon, comedy in 2 acts, mingled with song
- 1851: Les Trois âges des Variétés, panorama dramatique in 1 act, in verses, mingled with couplets
- 1852: Un Homme de cinquante ans, comédie-vaudeville in 1 act
- 1852: Les Reines des bals publics, folie-vaudeville in 1 act, with Delaporte
- 1853: La Forêt de Sénart, drama in 3 acts
- 1853: Les Femmes du monde, comédie vaudeville in 5 acts, with Eugène Cormon and Eugène Grangé
- 1853: La Fille de Madame Grégoire, vaudeville in 1 act, with Delaporte
- 1854: Brelan de maris, comédie-vaudeville in 1 act, with Laurencin
- 1854: M. Bannelet, comédie-vaudeville in 1 act, with Charles Nuitter
- 1854: Où passerai-je mes soirées, comédie-vaudeville in 1 act, with Charles Potier
- 1856: Le Fils de la France, cantata
- 1862: A Pie IX (8 juin 1862), ode

== Bibliography ==
- Stéphane Vachon, 1850, tombeau d'Honoré de Balzac, 2007, (p. 95)
