= Monsieur et Madame Denis =

Opéra comique by Jacques Offenbach

Jacques Offenbach by Nadar, c. 1860s

Monsieur et Madame Denis is a one-act opéra comique with music by Jacques Offenbach to a French libretto by Laurencin (Paul-Aimé Chapelle) and Michel Delaporte, first performed in 1862. The work was based on a popular vaudeville, and included a ‘chaconne’ (also quoted in the overture) which became well known in its own right.

== Background ==
A ‘chanson de M et Mme Denis’ by Marc-Antoine Désaugiers (1742–93) became a popular song during the late 18th century. It was included by the Baron de Rougemont (Michel-Nicolas Balisson, 1781–1840) in his 'tableau conjugal' Monsieur et Madame Denis performed at the Théâtre des Variétés in 1808. Later vaudevilles with a similar subject by Anicet and Delaporte and by Brazier and Simonnin were also successful in the French capital.

== Performance history ==
The premiere was on 11 January 1862 at the Théâtre des Bouffes-Parisiens, Paris, with Darcier and Simon making their debuts with the company. The work was later toured to Brussels and was seen at the Theater am Franz-Josefs-Kai in Vienna. The work was seen in Hamburg in May, Berlin in June and Budapest in July 1862. The chaconne was subsequently inserted in other popular shows as a "showpiece waltz".

The overture has been recorded by Hermann Scherchen conducting the Vienna State Opera Orchestra and by Antonio de Almeida with the Philharmonia Orchestra. The Chaconne was recorded in 2006 by Laura Claycomb as part of an Offenbach anthology.

== Roles ==
Role	Voice type	Premiere cast, 11 January 1862 (Conductor: Jacques Offenbach)
Lucile du Coudrai, niece of the Denis	soprano	Pfotzer
Gaston d’Amboise, godson of the Denis	soprano	Juliette Darcier
Nanette, servant	soprano	Simon
Bellerose, sergeant of the guard	tenor	Potel
Guardsmen (travesty roles)

== Synopsis ==
The salon at the house of Monsieur and Madame Denis, Paris, 1750

Gaston d’Amboise is the ward of Monsieur and Madame Denis and hopes to marry their niece Lucile.

The Denis's maid Nanette is alone at the house, preparing for the imminent return of Monsieur and Madame Denis from St Germain. Having abducted Lucile from her pension, Gaston arrives with her to seek his guardians’ blessing for their marriage. Nanette explains their absence, but just as they sit down to eat the Denis food and drink their wine while awaiting their arrival, guards knock at the door, the abduction having been discovered.

Gaston and Lucile have time to disguise themselves as Monsieur and Madame Denis, as the guards, led by Bellerose, enter, threatening to cart the two young lovers off to prison. Gaston, making a brusque movement reveals his sword and his wig slips. Bellerose leaves but returns suddenly with more soldiers.

Although the ruse has been discovered, Nanette starts serving the soldiers wine and they get drunk, then sing and dance. Lucile sings the chaconne, and the exhausted soldiers are tied up with curtains and rope. As Monsieur and Madame Denis arrive home the young couple run to greet them and the curtain falls.

== Musical numbers ==
- Overture
- Couplets (Nanette) « Hélas ! Un jour à mon tour la vieillesse »
- Duo (Lucile, Gaston) « Partir seule avec moi »
- Couplets de Bellerose « Vous voyez en moi Bellerose »
- Quatuor (Lucile, Nanette, Gaston, Bellerose) « Grand Dieu ! les voici réveillés »
- Morceau d’Ensemble « Marchons, marchons ensemble »
- Ensemble et Couplets à Boire « Versez et buvons à plein verre »
- La Chaconne (Lucile) « Dansons la Chaconne »
- Ronde du Guet « C’est la ronde qui partout veille »
- Final « En liberté je vais vous mettre »
