= Louis Bergeron =

French writer (1811–1890)

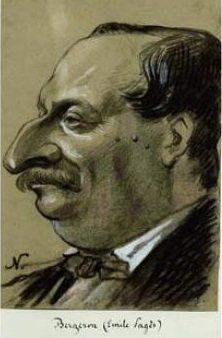
Louis Bergeron.jpg

Louis Bergeron (1 October 1811 in Chauny – 1 August 1890 in Croissy) was a 19th-century French journalist, writer and playwright.

== Works ==
- 1833: Campagnes d'Espagne et de Portugal sous l'Empire
- 1839: Fables démocratiques
- 1839: Un Neveu, s'il vous plaît, one-act folie-vaudeville, with Albéric Second
- 1840: L'Andalouse de Paris, one-act vaudeville, with Michel Delaporte
- 1842: Une jeunesse orageuse, wo-act comédie en vaudeville, with Charles Desnoyer
- 1845: L' article de la mort, physiologie d'un enterrement
- 1846: Le fou de Béthune, feuilleton
- 1847: L'Officier de marine, one-act vaudeville, with Bricet
- 1850: Chronique parisienne, under the pseudonym Émile Pagès
- 1852: Un mauvais père
- 1868: La Vérité sur les tontines indument appelées assurances mutuelles sur la vie
- 1870: Qu'est-ce que l'assurance sur la vie ?
- 1872: L'Avenir des familles
- 1873: Qu'est ce que l'assurance sur la vie ?
- 1874: Un Rêve de banquier philanthrope
- 1875: La Confession de Madame X...
- 1876: Aux Riches
- 1876: Les Sept milliards de la guerre remboursés en quarante-cinq ans sans augmentation d'impôts. Projet de conversion du 5 p. 100
- 1877: Une Pierre de touche
- 1886: La Providence des artistes
- 1888: Quelle est ma vie?, with Leo Tolstoy
- 1891: Œuvres de L. Bergeron sur les assurances
- 1892: Entre Femmes, causerie intime
- 1894: Assurances sur la vie. Le Talisman, souvenirs d'un assuré, posth.

== Bibliography ==
- Joseph-Marie Quérard, Charles Louandre, Félix Bourquelot, La Littérature française contemporaine: XIXe siècle, 1848, (p. 315)
- François Rittiez, Histoire du règne de Louis-Philippe Ier: 1830 à 1848, 1856, (p. 74)
- Gustave Vapereau, Dictionnaire universel des contemporains, 1858, (p. 173)
- Staaff, La Littérature française depuis la formation de la langue jusqu'à nos jours, volume 3, 1885, (p. 1241)
- Côté Croissy (n°30), January 2008 (read online)
