= Pierre-Louis Dietsch =

French composer and conductor

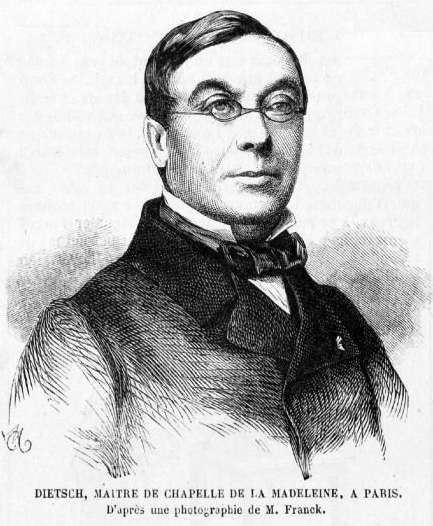
Engraving after a photo, published in 1865

Pierre-Louis-Philippe Dietsch (also Dietch, Dietzch, Dietz) (17 March 1808 – 20 February 1865) was a French composer and conductor, perhaps best remembered for the much anthologized Ave Maria 'by' Jacques Arcadelt, which he loosely arranged from that composer's three part madrigal Nous voyons que les hommes.

== Life and career ==
Dietsch was born in Dijon. According to Fétis, Dietsch was a choirboy at Dijon Cathedral and studied from 1822 at Choron's Institution Royale de Musique Classique et Religieuse in Paris. In 1830, Dietsch entered the Paris Conservatory and studied with Anton Reicha. His subjects included double bass, for which he won a first prize at the Conservatoire, as well counterpoint (with Reicha). Later, with the founding of the École Niedermeyer (successor of Choron's Institution) in 1853, Dietsch taught harmony, counterpoint, and fugue in a position he held up until his death.

Dietsch composed church music as well as an opera, Le Vaisseau fantôme, ou Le Maudit des mers ("The Phantom Ship, or The Accursed of the Sea"), which was first performed on 9 November 1842 at the Paris Opera. The libretto by Paul Foucher and H. Révoil was based on Walter Scott's The Pirate as well as Captain Marryat's The Phantom Ship and other sources, although Wagner thought it was based on his scenario for Der fliegende Holländer, which he had just sold to the Opéra. The similarity of Dietsch's opera to Wagner's is slight, although Wagner's assertion is often repeated. Berlioz thought Le Vaisseau fantôme too solemn, but other reviewers were more favourable.

In 1840, Dietsch had become chorus master at the Paris Opéra on Rossini's recommendation. He took over from Girard as conductor in 1860, but nonetheless could not avoid run-ins with the greatest composers of his day: Wagner blamed the fiasco of the Paris Opéra premiere of Tannhäuser (1861) on the conductor (perhaps unjustly, as Wagner had been closely involved in the opera's 164 rehearsals), and in 1863 Dietsch resigned over a dispute with Verdi in the midst of rehearsals for Verdi's Les Vêpres siciliennes.

He died in Paris aged 56.

=== Ave Maria attributed to Arcadelt ===
The most well known work of Dietsch may be the Ave Maria he presented in 1842 and attributed to Franco-Flemish Renaissance composer Jacques Arcadelt. Dietsch presented the work as a discovery of a four-voice Ave Maria by Arcadelt, when in fact it was Dietsch's own arrangement of Arcadelt's three-voice chanson Nous voyons que les hommes. The work was popular, leading to an arrangement for solo piano entitled Chanson d'Arcadelt "Ave Maria" (S.183) by Franz Liszt published in 1865, and serving as a direct source for the initial section of the principal theme of the Maestoso in the Organ Symphony of Camille Saint-Saëns published in 1886. In the latter case, this theme is among the most recognizable part of one of the most well known of Saint-Saëns' works, with several modern interpretations in popular music. Nevertheless, Saint-Saëns' criticized the work itself, noting in a letter printed in The Catholic Choirmaster

...the defective prosody had always made me doubt the authenticity of the piece because ancient works are always perfectly written from the point of view of prosody. I was astonished, therefore, when I learned from Dietsch ... that he was himself the composer of the celebrated Ave Maria and that its fame was due to fraud.

=== Recordings ===
Le Vaisseau fantôme has been recorded by Les Musiciens du Louvre, Grenoble under Marc Minkowski.

== Sources ==
- Cooper, Jeffrey; Millington, Barry (1992), "Dietsch [Dietch, Dietzch, Dietz], (Pierre-)Louis(-Philippe)", in Sadie (1992), vol. 1, p. 1175.
- Cooper, Jeffrey; Millington, Barry (2001), "Dietsch [Dietch, Dietzch, Dietz], (Pierre-)Louis(-Philippe)", in Sadie (2001).
- Sadie, Stanley (ed.), The New Grove Dictionary of Opera, (4 volumes) (London: Macmillan, 1992), ISBN 978-1-56159-228-9.
- Sadie, Stanley and John Tyrell (eds.), The New Grove Dictionary of Music and Musicians, 2nd edition (London: Macmillan, 2001), ISBN 978-1-56159-239-5 (hardcover), OCLC 419285866 (eBook).
