= Mécène Marié de l'Isle =

French opera singer

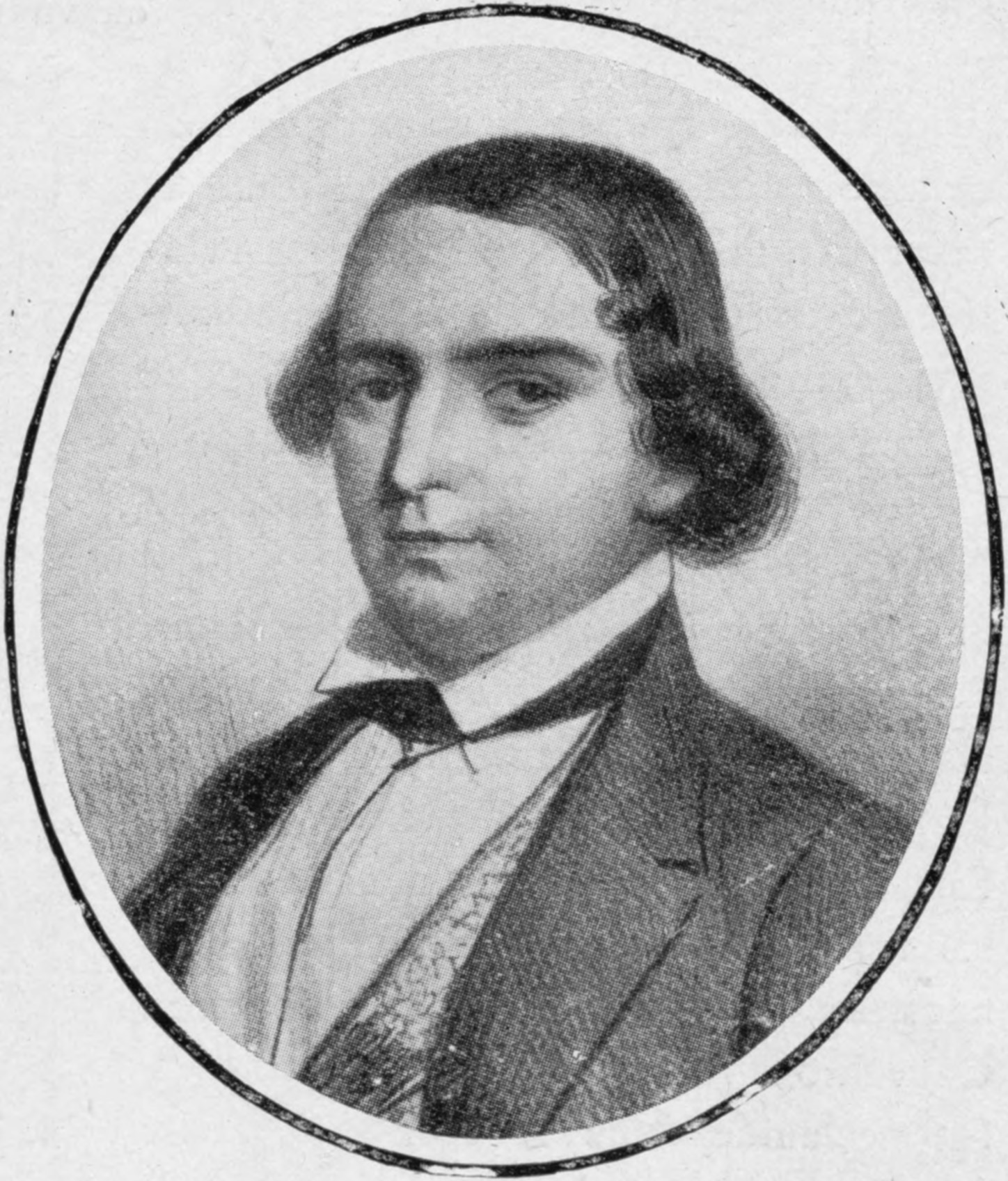
Marié

Mécène Marié de l'Isle (22 May 1811 – 14 August 1879) was a French musician and opera singer, who used the stage name Marié.

== Early training and career ==
Born Claude-Marie-Mécène Marié de l'Isle in Château-Chinon, he went to Paris to study music at the Conservatoire, where he won first prize for double-bass in 1830. He began his career as a tenor in the opera chorus of the Opéra-Comique in Paris and made his professional opera début at the opera house in Metz as Raoul in Meyerbeer's Les Huguenots in 1838. The following year he portrayed his first role at the Opéra-Comique, singing Albert in Louis Clapisson’s La symphonie. In 1840 he had the distinction of portraying Tonio in the world premiere of Donizetti’s La fille du régiment.

== Paris Opera ==
Marié left the Opéra-Comique in 1841 to join the roster of principal tenors at the Paris Opera. He remained there through 1844, singing such roles as Eléazar in La Juive, Max in Der Freischütz, Arnold in Guillaume Tell, Raoul, Fernand in La favorite, and the title role in Robert le diable. He began to experience vocal difficulties in his upper register in the mid-1840s and decided to retrain his voice as a baritone. In 1845-1848 he sang his first baritone roles at La Monnaie and in opera houses in Italy.

In 1848 Marié returned to the Opera where he remained for the rest of his career. While there he sang the title role of Guillaume Tell, Nevers in Les Huguenots, Alphonse in La favorite, and Raimbaud in Le comte Ory. In 1851 he portrayed the role of Alcée in the premiere of Gounod's Sapho. In 1855 he performed the role of Robert in the premiere of Verdi's Les vêpres siciliennes. In 1862 he sang Phanor in the premiere of Gounod's La reine de Saba.

== Late career ==
Around 1860 he was the conductor of the orchestra at the Café Charles in Paris. Marié semi-retired from the stage in 1864, but occasionally returned to the stage for performances as late as 1879. He was active as a voice teacher from 1864 up until his death. His pupils included his three daughters, notably Célestine Galli-Marié, who created the title role in the premiere of Bizet's Carmen.

Marié died in Compiègne.
