= Charles Dezobry =

French historian (1798–1871)

Louis Charles Dezobry (4 March 1798 – 16 August 1871) was a 19th-century French historian and historical novelist, born in Franciade, Seine, French First Republic.

== Works ==
- Rome au siècle d'Auguste, ou Voyage d'un Gaulois à Rome à l'époque du règne d'Auguste et pendant une partie du règne de Tibère (1835) Inline
- La Mauvaise récolte, ou les Suites de l'ignorance (1847)
- L'Histoire en peinture, ou Épisodes historiques propres à être traduits en tableaux. Histoire romaine. Tableaux d'histoire, passages historiques, tableaux de genre (1848)
- Dictionnaire général de biographie et d'histoire, de mythologie, de géographie ancienne et moderne comparée, des antiquités et des institutions grecques, romaines françaises et étrangères, with Théodore Bachelet (1863)
- Référence:Dictionnaire général des lettres, des beaux-arts et des sciences morales et politiques (Bachelet et Dezobry)|Dictionnaire général des lettres, des beaux-arts et des sciences morales et politiques, en collaboration avec Théodore Bachelet (1863)
- Dictionnaire pratique et critique de l'art épistolaire français, avec des préceptes et des conseils sur chaque genre ; plus de mille modèles choisis dans les monuments et les documents de la langue française, et des remarques sur chaque lettre (1866)
- Traité élémentaire de versification française, suivi d'un album alphabétique des vers proverbes français (1866)
