= Théodore Bachelet =

French historian and musicologist (1820–1879)

- Born: Jean-Louis-Théodore Bachelet; 15 January 1820; Pissy-Pôville (Seine-Inférieure)
- Died: 26 September 1879 (aged 59); Rouen
- Occupations: Historian; Lexicographer

Jean-Louis-Théodore Bachelet (15 January 1820 – 26 September 1879) was a 19th-century French historian and musicologist.

== Biography ==
After studying at the Lycée Pierre-Corneille in Rouen and the Lycée Hoche in Versailles, he entered the École normale in 1840 and was received agrégé d'histoire in 1846. Successively a teacher of history at colleges in Le Havre, Chartres and St. Quentin, then in high schools at Clermont-Ferrand and Coutances, he was appointed in 1847 Professor of History at lycée of Rouen, where he taught until 1873 and in the preparatory school to higher education in this city. Also an accomplished musicologist, he donated his important fifteenth to eighteenth centuries sheet music collection at the Library of Rouen of which he also was responsible after 1873.

In collaboration with Charles Dezobry, Bachelet wrote:

- Dictionnaire Général de Biographie et d'Histoire, de Mythologie, de Géographie ancienne et Moderne comparée, des Antiquités et des Institutions grecques, romaines, françaises et étrangères, Paris, 1857 and 1863. Reprint: Paris, Delagrave, 1889, 2 vol., 2989 p.;
- Dictionnaire des Lettres, des Beaux-Arts et des Sciences Morales et Politiques, Paris, 1863.

He is also the author of simple popular works, published under his name or under the pseudonyms "Bosquet" or "Mignan", by the éditions Mégard in Rouen; The nine children's books published by Mégard had a circulation of nearly 200,000 copies.

== Publications ==
- 1837: Psaumes et cantiques en faux bourdon, Rouen, Fleury Fils Ainé.
- 1852: La Guerre de cent ans, Rouen, Mégard; rééd. Nîmes, Lacour, 2013.
- 1863: Les Français en Italie au XVI, Rouen, Mégard.
- 1853: Mahomet et les Arabes, Rouen, Mégard
- 1853: Les Rois catholiques d’Espagne, Rouen, Mégard.
- 1859: les Grands Ministres français : Suger, Jacques Cœur, Sully, Richelieu, Mazarin, Colbert
- 1868: Histoire de Napoléon Ier, Rouen, Mégard
- 1863: Saint-Louis roi de France
- 1868–75: Cours d’histoire, 3 vol., Paris, A. Courcier, 1878–1885.
- 1869: François Ier et son siècle
- 1871–74: Cours d’histoire de France, 3 vol., Paris, A. Courcier, 1874–1879.
- 1864: Les Hommes illustres de France, Rouen, Mégard.
- 1874: Histoire des temps modernes, Paris, A. Courcier.
- 1886: Les Arabes : origine, mœurs, religion, conquêtes, Rouen, Mégard.

== Sources ==
- Édouard Frère, Manuel du bibliographe normand, Rouen, Le Brument, 1860, (p. 59).
- Gustave Vapereau, Dictionnaire universel des contemporains, Paris, Hachette, 1870, (p. 84).
