= Marc Minkowski =

French conductor of classical music (born 1962)

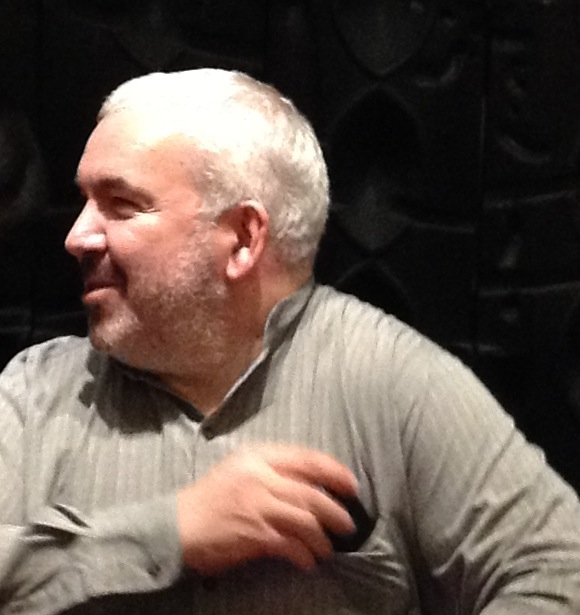
Minkowski in Hong Kong Cultural Centre (2013)

Marc Minkowski (born 4 October 1962) is a French conductor of classical music, especially known for his interpretations of French Baroque works.

== Life and career ==
Minkowski was born in Paris. His maternal grandmother, Edith Wade, was a violinist. His mother, Mary Anne Minkowski (née Wade), is American, and his father was Alexandre Minkowski, a Polish-French professor of pediatrics and one of the founders of neonatology. He began his musical career as a bassoonist for René Clemencic's Clemencic Consort and Philippe Pierlot's Ricercar Consort.

In 1982, Minkowski formed "Les Musiciens du Louvre", an orchestra dedicated to showcasing French Baroque music which has championed works by Marin Marais (opera Alcyone), Jean-Joseph Mouret (opera Les amours de Ragonde), Marc-Antoine Charpentier, Jean-Baptiste Lully (opera Phaëton at Opéra National de Lyon) and Jean-Philippe Rameau (opera Hippolyte et Aricie). The ensemble has also revived lesser-known Handel operas, such as Teseo, Amadigi, Riccardo Primo and Ariodante, as well as several operas by Christoph Willibald Gluck, including Armide (at the Centre de Musique Baroque de Versailles), Alceste and Iphigénie en Tauride (at the English Bach Festival at the Royal Opera House, Covent Garden). Les Musiciens du Louvre relocated to Grenoble after 1996, where they are associates at the Maison de la Culture de Grenoble.

Minkowski's career focus has shifted from an initial specialized interest in the Baroque to a wider interest in opera. He conducted Mozart's Idomeneo in 1996 at the Opéra National de Paris and debuted his Die Entführung aus dem Serail at the Salzburg Festival. He has since conducted Mozart's Le Nozze di Figaro at the Festival d'Aix-en-Provence and Mitridate, re di Ponto at the Salzburg Festival, Handel's Giulio Cesare in Amsterdam, Paris and Zürich (with Cecilia Bartoli) and his Il Trionfo del Tempo e del Disinganno in Zürich, Donizetti's La Favorite in Zürich, and Gluck's Iphigénie en Tauride, among others. He has also performed and recorded works by Jacques Offenbach: Orphée aux Enfers, La belle Hélène and La Grande-Duchesse de Gérolstein, along with the Concerto militaire for cello and orchestra in G, with cellist Jérôme Pernoo.

From 2008 to 2012, Minkowski was music director of Sinfonia Varsovia. Minkowski was music director of the International Mozarteum Foundation's Mozartwoche in Salzburg, Austria from 2013 to 2017 and was general director of the Opéra national de Bordeaux from 2016 to 2021. Minkowski first guest-conducted Boston Baroque in December 2025. In April 2026, Boston Baroque announced the appointment of Minkowski as its next music director, effective with the 2026-2027 season.

His recordings can be found on Erato, EMI's Virgin Classics and Naïve Records. In 2014, Naïve released a recording of the original version of Der fliegende Holländer and the first recording of Le Vaisseau fantôme by Dietsch, conducted by Minkowski. Minkowski was awarded the Prize XVIIe in 1988 for his recordings of Lully-Molière : Les Comédies ballets par les Musiciens du Louvre, (Erato Records).

Minkowski is a Chevalier du Mérite.
