= Théâtre de la Gaîté (rue Papin) =

Former theatre in Paris, France

- Théâtre de la Gaîté-Lyrique; Théâtre National Lyrique (1876–7); Opéra Populaire (1879)
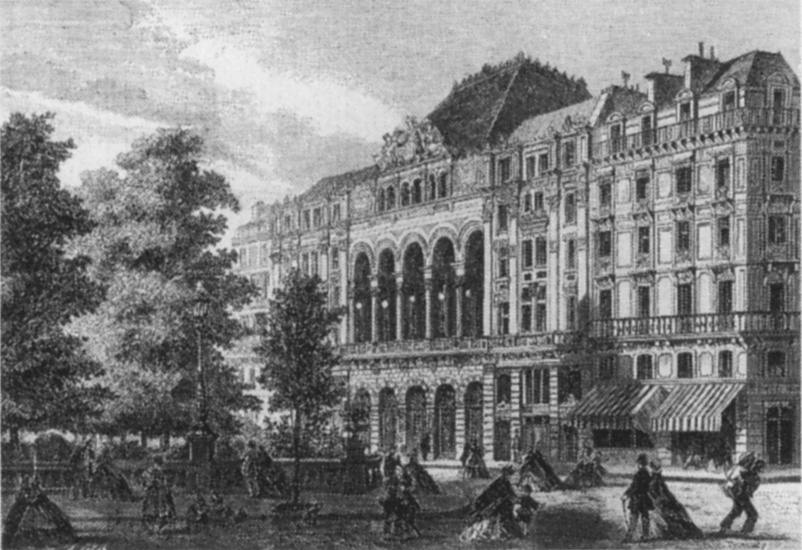
- The Théâtre de la Gaîté on the rue Papin in 1862
- Interactive map of Théâtre de la Gaîté (rue Papin)
- Address: 3–5 rue Papin, 3rd arrondissement Paris; France
- Coordinates: 48°51′59.5″N 2°21′12″E
- Capacity: 1800 seats

Construction
- Opened: 1862
- Demolished: 1989 except for the facade, entrance and foyer

In 1862 during Haussmann's modernization of Paris, the Théâtre de la Gaîté (French pronunciation: [teɑtʁ də la ɡɛte]) of the boulevard du Temple was relocated to the rue Papin across from the Square des Arts et Métiers. The new theatre, built in an Italian style to designs of the architects Jacques-Ignace Hittorff and Alphonse Cusin, opened on 3 September.

Within a decade, the focus began to shift from melodrama to operetta and opera, so the theatre also came to be known as the Gaîté-Lyrique. In the early 1920s, Diaghilev's Ballets Russes danced here, and after World War II it was used for musical comedy. In the 1970s, attendance decreased, and there were several attempts to find new uses for the building, culminating in 1989 in the construction of a short-lived amusement park, that resulted in the demolition of most of the theatre, except for the facade, entrance and foyer. The latter were restored during a 2004 reconstruction that converted the building into an arts centre, La Gaîté Lyrique, completed in November 2010.

== 19th century ==
Jacques Offenbach was the director of the Théâtre de la Gaîté from 1873 to 1874. His opéra-bouffe-féerie Le roi Carotte was first performed here in 1872 and his opéra-féerie Le voyage dans la lune in 1875. The opera Le timbre d'argent by Camille Saint-Saëns was premiered here in 1877, at which time the theatre was briefly known as the Théâtre National Lyrique.

Premieres

- 1872: Jacques Offenbach's opéra-bouffe-féerie Le roi Carotte
- 1874: Offenbach's revised Opéra-féerie version of Orphée aux enfers (Orpheus in the Underworld)
- 1875: Offenbach's revised Opéra-bouffe version of Geneviève de Brabant
- 1875: Offenbach's opéra-féerie Le voyage dans la lune
- 1876: Victorin Joncières's opera Dimitri
- 1877: Camille Saint-Saëns' opera Le timbre d'argent
- 1913: Jules Massenet's opera Panurge
- 1914: Guido Bianchini's opera Radda

== 20th century ==
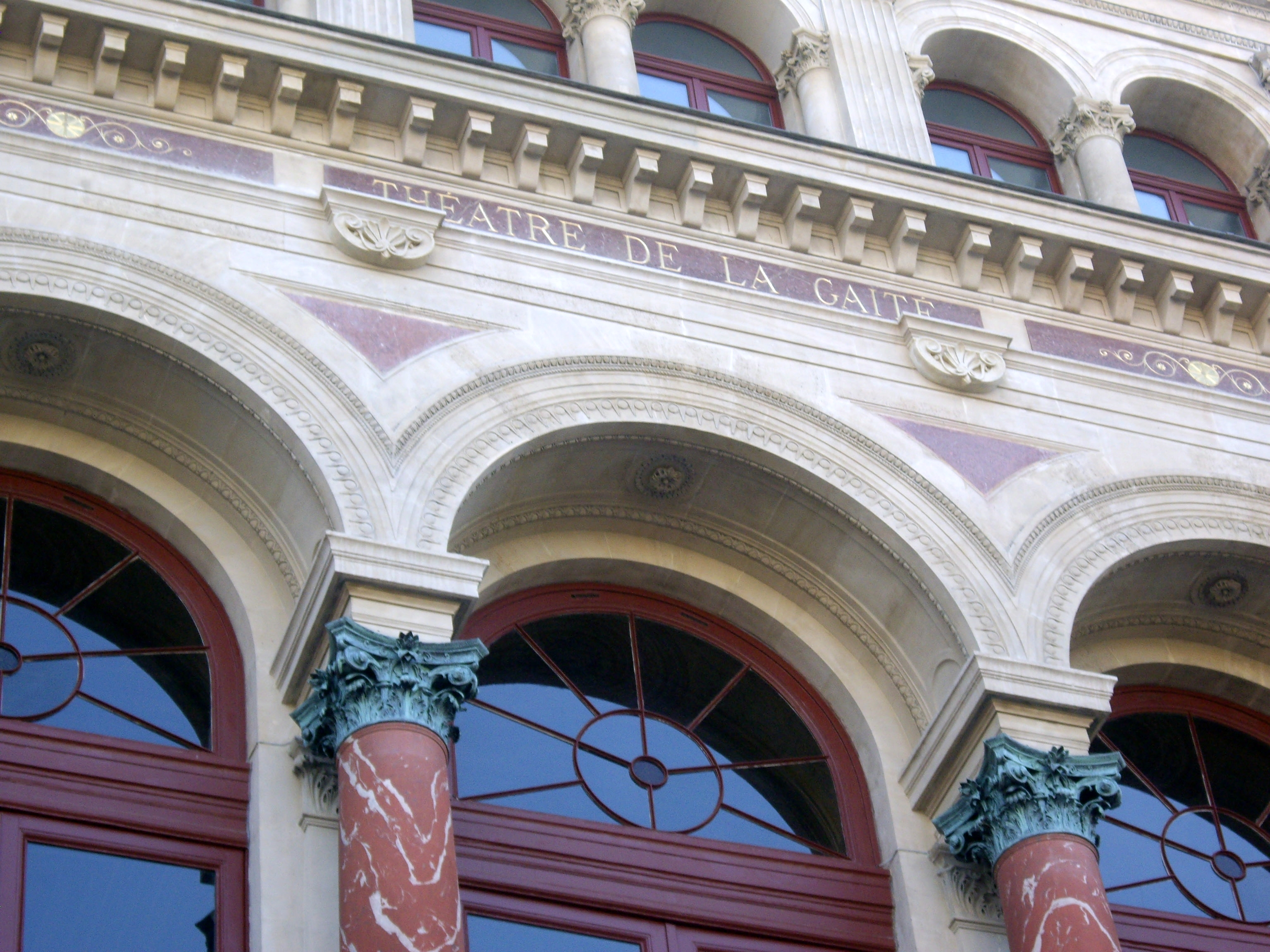
Théâtre de la Gaîté on the rue Papin (detail of the facade)

Serge Diaghilev's Ballets Russes danced at the theatre in 1921, 1923, and 1925. The 1921 performances included the ballerina Lydia Lopokova in the title role of Igor Stravinsky's The Firebird, and the company gave premieres of Prokofiev's Chout (17 May 1921) and Stravinsky's Les noces (13 June 1923).

Beginning on 15 November 1932, Franz Lehár's The Land of Smiles was first performed in France. It was given in a French adaptation by André Mauprey and Jean Marietti with the title Le pays du sourire. The Dutch tenor Willy Thunis, who did not speak a word of French, sang Sou-Chong. The production received its 1,000th performance on 17 April 1939.

During the Second World War, the theatre was looted during the occupation. The large chandelier installed by Offenbach disappeared, as well the Emperor's golden coach, which had been stored in the service quarters.

After the war, Henri Montjoye (né Barbero) took over the theatre, and after his death in 1950, his widow, the soprano Germaine Roger, became the theatre's director. Numerous successes were put on. The 2-act operetta Andalousie by Albert Willemetz and Raymond Vincy with music by Francis Lopez had a 12-month run that began on 25 October 1947. The 2-act Colorado by Claude Dufresne, billed as an opérette à grand spectacle with music by Jacques-Henry Rys and lyrics by Jacques Larue, starred the bass Armand Mestral (who alternated with Michel Dens) in the role of Jim Bullit, the tenor Lou Pizzara as Ricardo Diaz, the soprano Claude Chenard as Katharina Sanders, and Maurice Baquet as the little saloon pianist. The show opened on 16 December 1950 and ran for 11 months. It was revived at the theatre beginning on 12 February 1959 with Mestral and Baquet reprising their roles and Bernard Alvi as Ricardo and Andrée Grandjean as Katharina. It later went on tour and received provincial productions up into the 1990s. Visa pour l'amour, a vehicle for two of Paris's biggest musical comedy stars, the tenor Luis Mariano and the comedian Annie Cordy, was a 2-act opérette gaie with music by Lopez and a book by Vincy. It premiered in December 1961 and received around 600 performances.

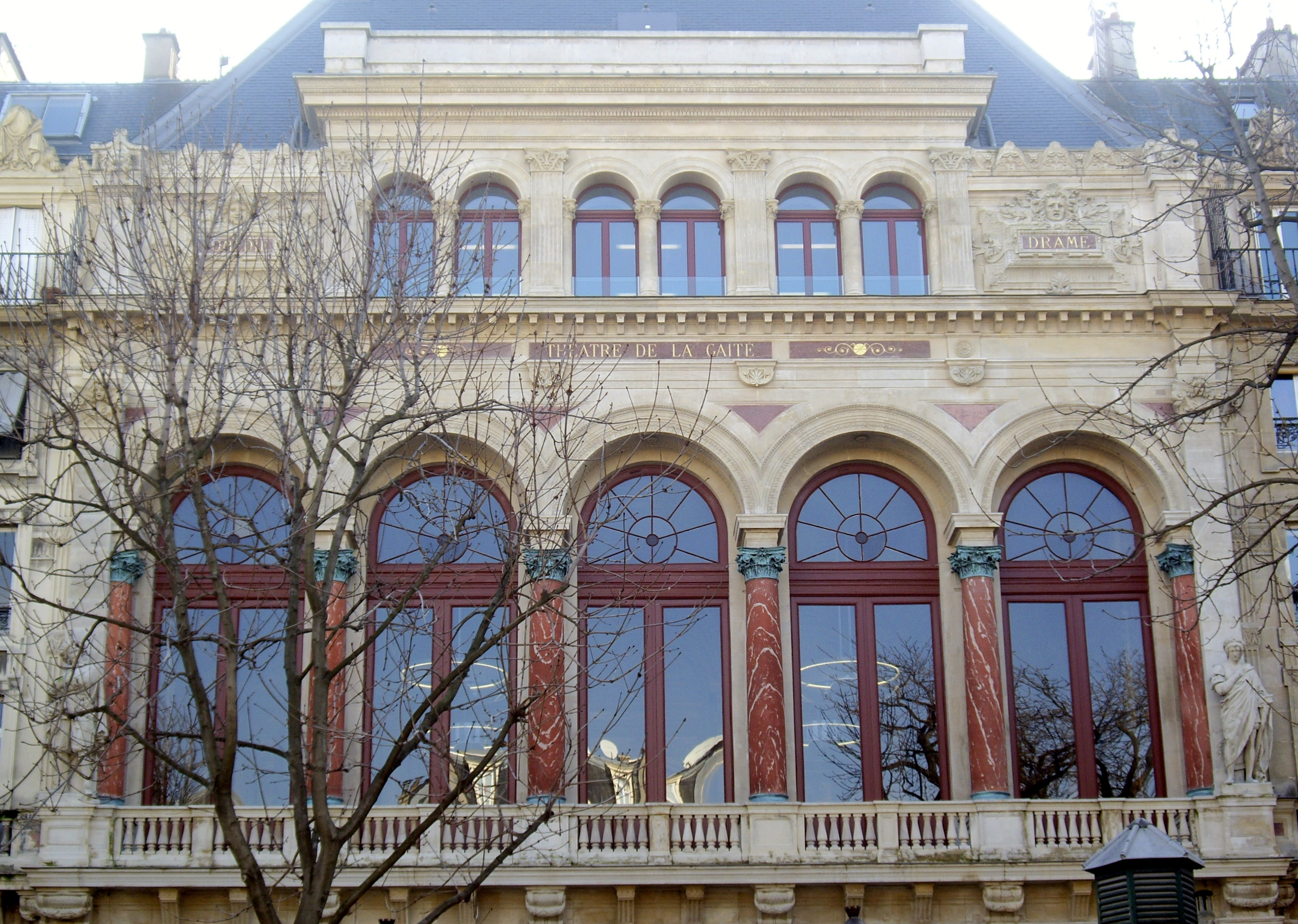
Théâtre de la Gaîté on the rue Papin (upper facade)

In the 1970s, the Carré Silvia-Monfort presented contemporary theatre, and some singers and a circus school, the Cirque Gruss, who offered their spectacles in the facing square, based themselves here for a time, and converted the attic of the theatre into stables for elephants.

In the early 1980s, the dome of the main auditorium was threatening to collapse and was reinforced with concrete. In 1989, much of the theatre was demolished and transformed into an amusement park, Planète magique, by Jean Chalopin. The main auditorium, originally holding 1800, and the orchestra pit, apparently large enough for 60 musicians, were among the parts of the building lost at this time. The venture was a failure and closed in 1991. Manuelle Gautrand, the architect who was in charge of the later restoration of the surviving parts of the theatre as well as the reconstruction and modernization of the demolished interior spaces, described the scene as follows: "The historical foyer and the lobby had been stripped of their original style and had been redecorated with vulgar colors and statues", and the amusement park itself was "an incredible accumulation of monumental sets, combining pieced together dragons, rockets from the 80s, the world of Barbie, treasure hunts among the Incas…. A sort of 'low tech Disneyland' in the centre of Paris".

In December 2003, restoration work began, and in December 2010, La Gaîté Lyrique was re-opened as a digital arts and modern music centre.

Since December 2024, the Gaîté Lyrique has been occupied by 300 migrants whose applications for recognition as minorities have been rejected. The venue's programming has therefore been cancelled.

== See also ==
- Théâtre de la Gaîté (boulevard du Temple)
- La Gaîté Lyrique
- Théâtre de la Gaîté-Montparnasse
