= Théâtre de l'Ambigu-Comique =

Former theatre in Paris, France

The first Théâtre de l’Ambigu-Comique (1769-1827)
- Les Comédiens de Bois
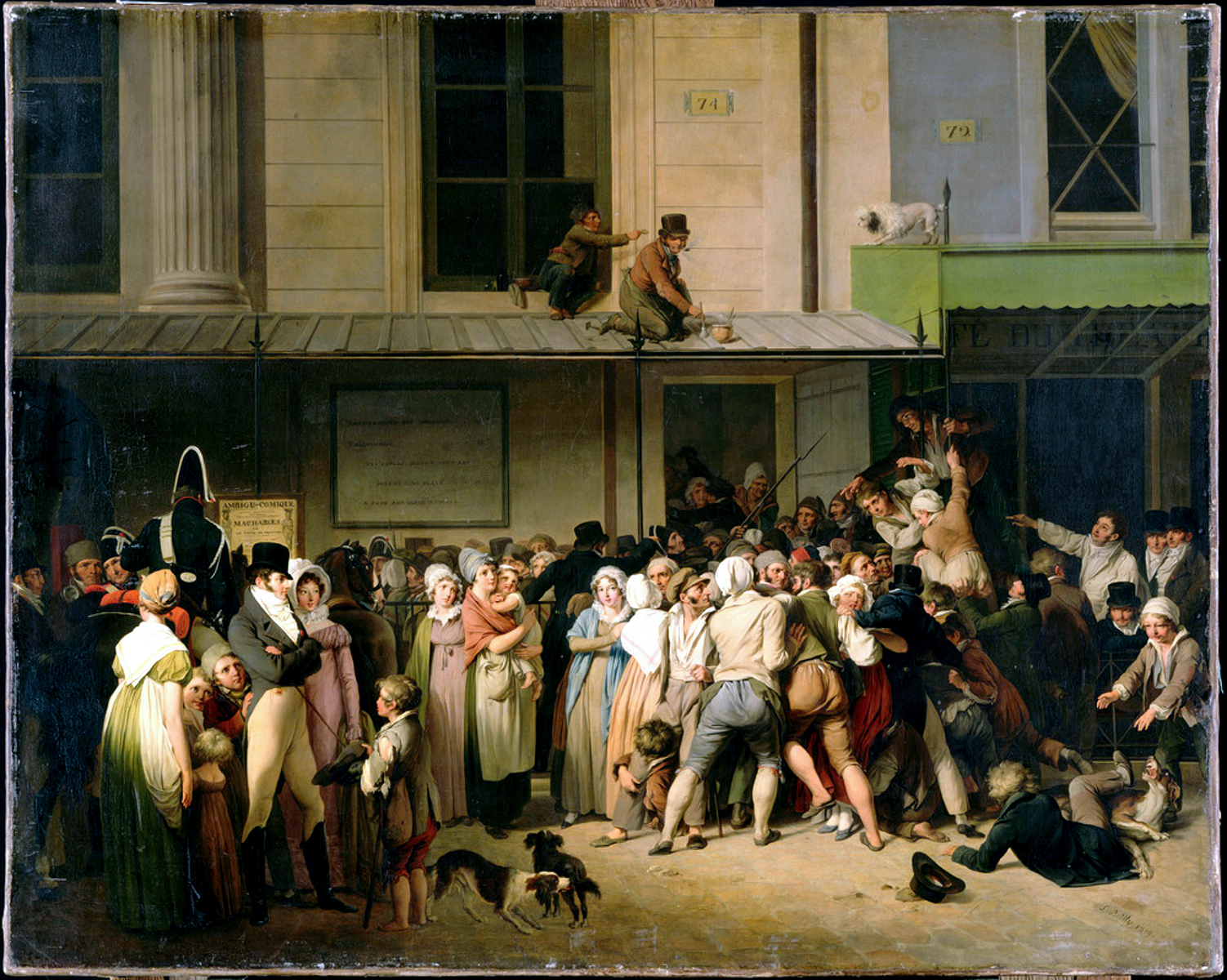
- The entrance to the Théâtre de l'Ambigu-Comique on the day of a free show. Louis-Léopold Boilly (1819)
- Interactive map of The first Théâtre de l’Ambigu-Comique (1769-1827)
- Address: 62 boulevard du Temple, 11th arrondissement 48.8670°N 2.3651°E; Paris

Construction
- Opened: 9 July 1769
- Closed: burnt down 13 July 1827

The Théâtre de l’Ambigu-Comique (pronounced [teɑtʁ də lɑ̃biɡy kɔmik], literally, Theatre of the Comic-Ambiguity), a former Parisian theatre, was founded in 1769 on the boulevard du Temple immediately adjacent to the Théâtre de Nicolet. It was rebuilt in 1770 and 1786, but in 1827 was destroyed by fire. A new, larger theatre with a capacity of 2,000 as compared to the earlier 1,250 was built nearby on the Boulevard Saint-Martin at its intersection with the rue de Bondy and opened the following year. The theatre was eventually demolished in 1966.

== History of the first theatre in the boulevard du Temple ==
It was founded in 1769 on the boulevard du Temple, originally known as the Promenades des Ramparts, in Paris by Nicolas-Médard Audinot, formerly a comedian of the Opéra-Comique, which he had left to become a puppet-master at the Paris fairs. Audinot had already been a success in one of the sites of the Saint-Germain Fair, where his large marionettes (called "bamboches") were in vogue.

Under the name of his foundation, the "Comédiens de bois", the Opéra-Comique proposed pantomimes and "féeries" (spectacles), then he enlarged his repertoire to include marionettes, child-performers, and acrobats, in comedies, vaudeville shows, "opéras comiques", dramas and pantomimes.

The variety and mix of these theatrical modes justified and explained changing the theatre's name, after only one year, from "Comédiens de bois" to "Ambigu-Comique" when Audinot substituted child-performers for marionettes. Audinot also used wooden puppets to spitefully reenact his former colleagues from the Comédie Italienne. Audinot saved the profits he made from shows and constructed a permanent theatre building on the Boulevard du Temple, which officially opened on 9 July 1769. The following April, Audinot added to his puppets with a few young children, who he trained up in the theatrical arts, and painted the motto "Sicut infantes audi nos" on the theatre's curtain. His success caused Delille to write "Dear Audinot, childhood attired as old age".

The architectural success of the theatre was mostly due to the ambitious and inventive set designer, Louis Daguerre. Daguerre, who is also credited with developing early photography and diorama theatre (1822), was an expert in scenic and lighting design and created picturesque effects within the theatre.

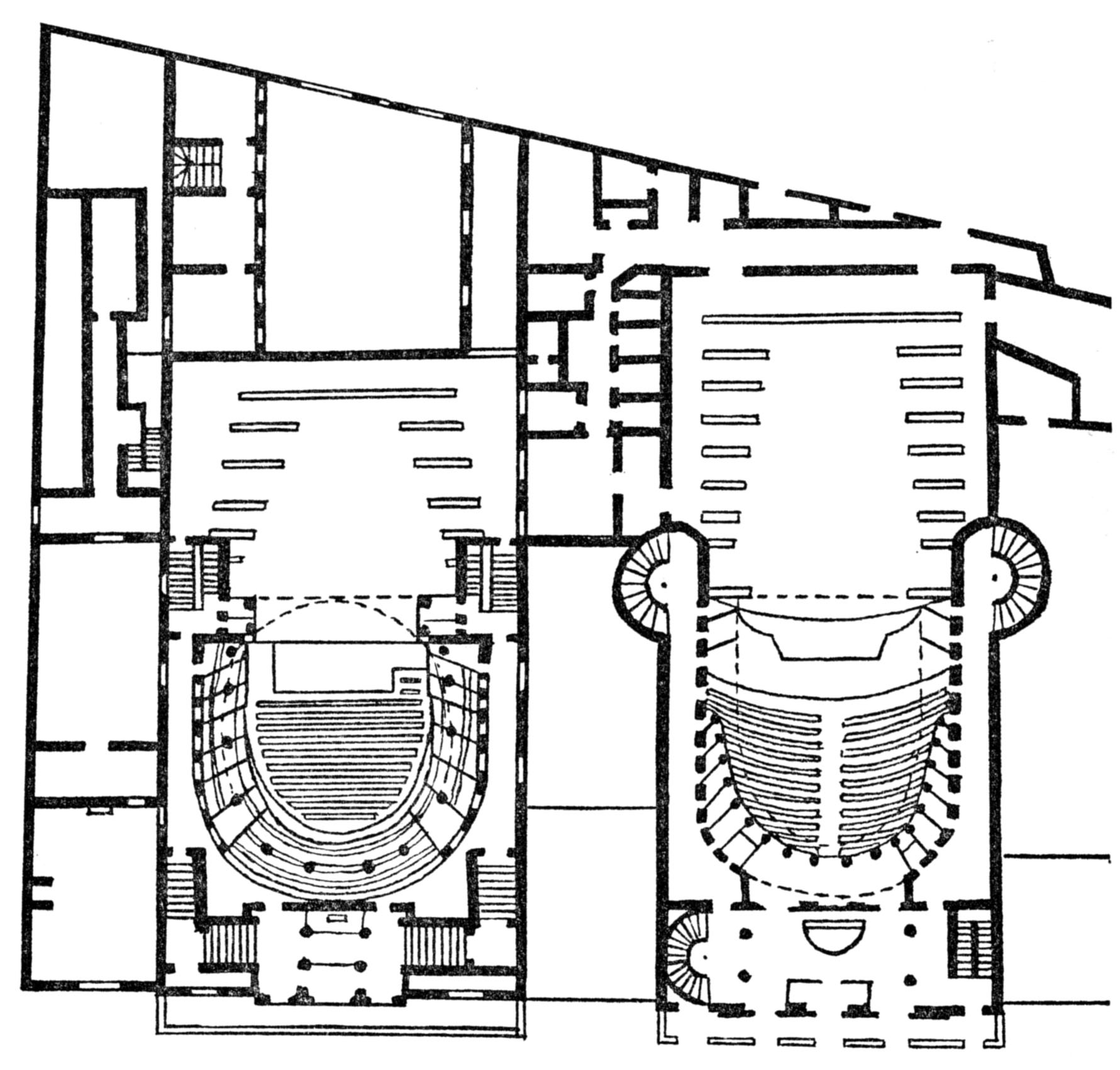
Plans of the Ambigu-Comique (left) and the Théâtre de Nicolet (Théâtre de la Gaîté (boulevard du Temple), right), on the boulevard du Temple. The Ambigu-Comique and the Gaîté had a smaller number of boxes for privileged clientele than other Parisian theatres. These were separated by only half partitions that were more steeply angled toward the stage. The boxes usually found at the rear of a theatre were replaced with galleries of benches which seated more people. These arrangements provided more patrons with a better view of the stage, rather than a view of the other members of the audience.

A Conseil decision of 1771 (demanded by the Opéra) banned singing, dancing, and having more than four musicians aroused such emotion that it was revoked only a few days later, and Audinot took full advantage of the situation. Judging, in 1772, that the time was right to extend the building, he gave up puppetry altogether, replacing them entirely with child-performers. Not entirely released from the ties which had brought about his rise in the large theatres, from 1780 he had to pay the Opéra a fee for representation and to engage him but not use him, in producing ballets and lyric pieces borrowed for that scene, whose shows had at least ten years of publicity. The Comédie-Française and the Comédie-Italienne stipulated, for their part, that dialogue pieces in the repertoire would be submitted to them before being played, so they could edit and change them to their own advantage.

Despite these problems and burdens, the Ambigu was able to rebuild and enlarge its theatre in 1786. Audinot sustained the fashion for "pantomimes historiques and "pantomimes romanesques" such as "Belle au bois dormant", "Masque de fer", "Forêt-Noire", and "Capitaine Cook". The Ambigu's success was equally down to the "comédies graveleuses" written by its official writers Plainchesne and Moline. Bachaumont even noted in 1771 that Audinot's theatre was better attended than the Opéra.

Being located on the Boulevard du Temple amongst several other successful theaters created a healthy competition and a spark that the Ambigu used to strive to achieve greatness. Some of the theaters along the Boulevard included Theatre de Nicolet, Theatre des Associes, Theatre des Delassement-Comiques, and many others. The Comedie Francais, which was established back in 1680 and was certainly well known throughout Europe, coexisted with the Ambigu and, therefore, they competed each other for an audience. However, l’Ambigu's biggest rival was Théâtre Feydeau. The Feydeau was closed by the government due to the social “turbulence” it invoked, and on 3 February 1795 Théâtre de l’Ambigu showed a production of "Le Concert de la rue Feydeau." This production was a satirical piece and a supposedly “lighthearted attack” against The Feydeau which was taken the wrong way to many viewers and caused “angry crowds to surround the Ambigu for two evenings until the Committee of Public Saftety demanded that the play be withdrawn in the interests of public tranquility” (Carlson.)

The proclamation of the freedom of the theatres in 1791 gave rise to a large number of rivals to the Ambigu, which was forced to close in 1799. In 1801, Audinot inaugurated a melodrama with Guilbert de Pixérécourt, Caigniez and Victor Ducange. In addition to the big name of Pixerecourt, actor Frederick Lemaitre played “Robert Macaire,” a classic villain in many French plays, in 1823 with outstanding success. After Audinot stepped down as the director, one of the company's actors named Picardeaux took over, followed by Andre Coffin-Rosny, then Hector Chaussier, and another actor, Cammaile Saint-Aubin. The Ambigu's building burned down on 13 July 1827.

== History of the second theatre in the boulevard Saint-Martin ==
The second Théâtre de l’Ambigu-Comique (c. 1827-1966)
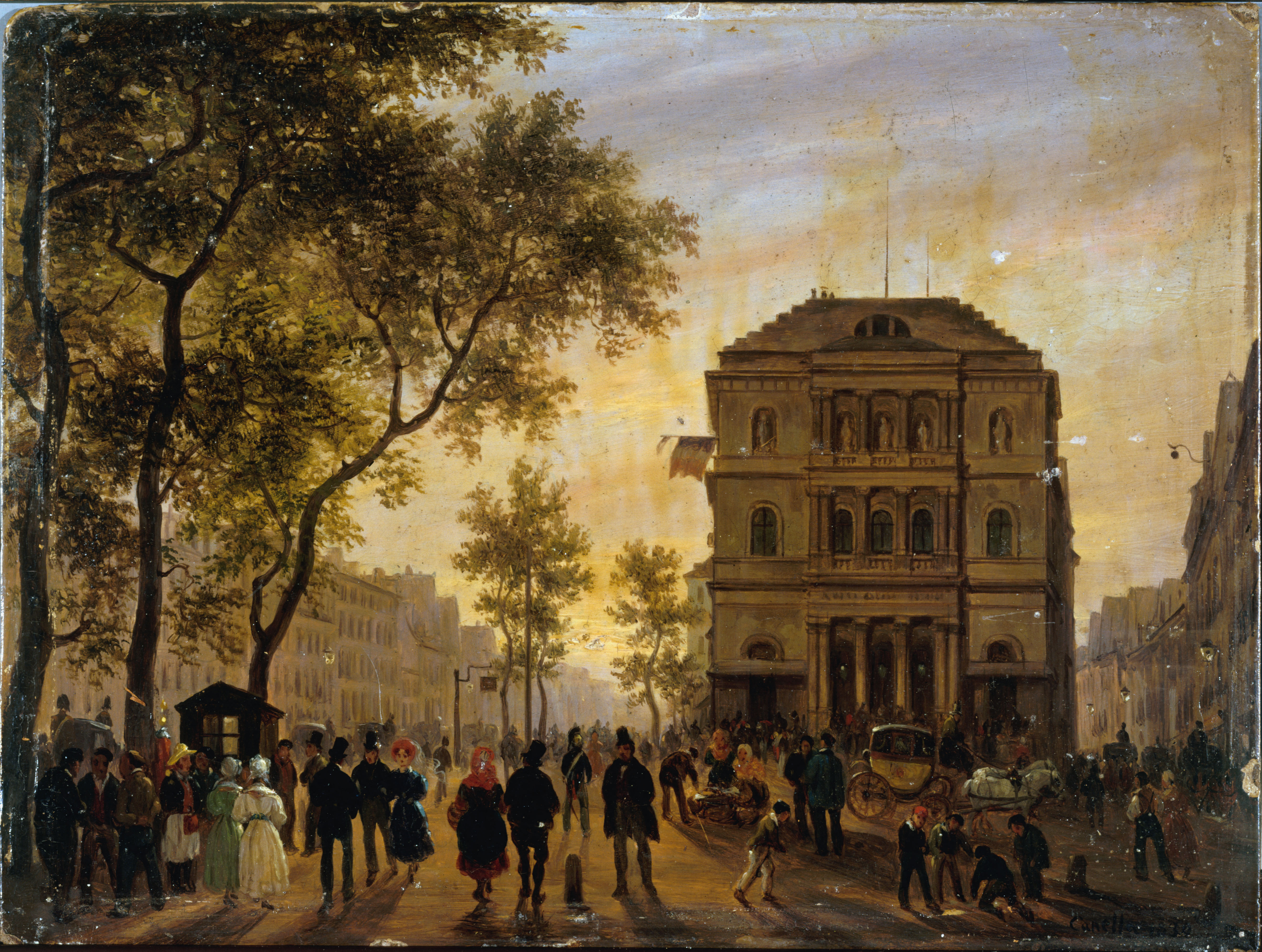
- The Théâtre de l'Ambigu-Comique on the boulevard Saint-Martin
- Interactive map of The second Théâtre de l’Ambigu-Comique (c. 1827-1966)
- Address: 2 boulevard Saint-Martin, 10th arrondissement 48.86860°N 2.35928°E; Paris

Construction
- Opened: 7 June 1828
- Demolished: 1966

The theatre was rebuilt to plans by the architects Jacques Ignace Hittorff and Jean-François-Joseph Lecointe on the Boulevard Saint-Martin, at the corner of rue de Bondy (now rue René-Boulanger). The 19th century saw the Ambigu's success augmented, so much so that its grand spectacles, dramas, melodramas, "pièces de boulevard" and vaudeville shows remain the most faithful representation of the dramatic traditions of what is called "the boulevard of crime" ("le boulevard du crime").

Productions of adapted novels were successful such as Émile Zola's L’Assommoir in 1879 and Nana in 1881.

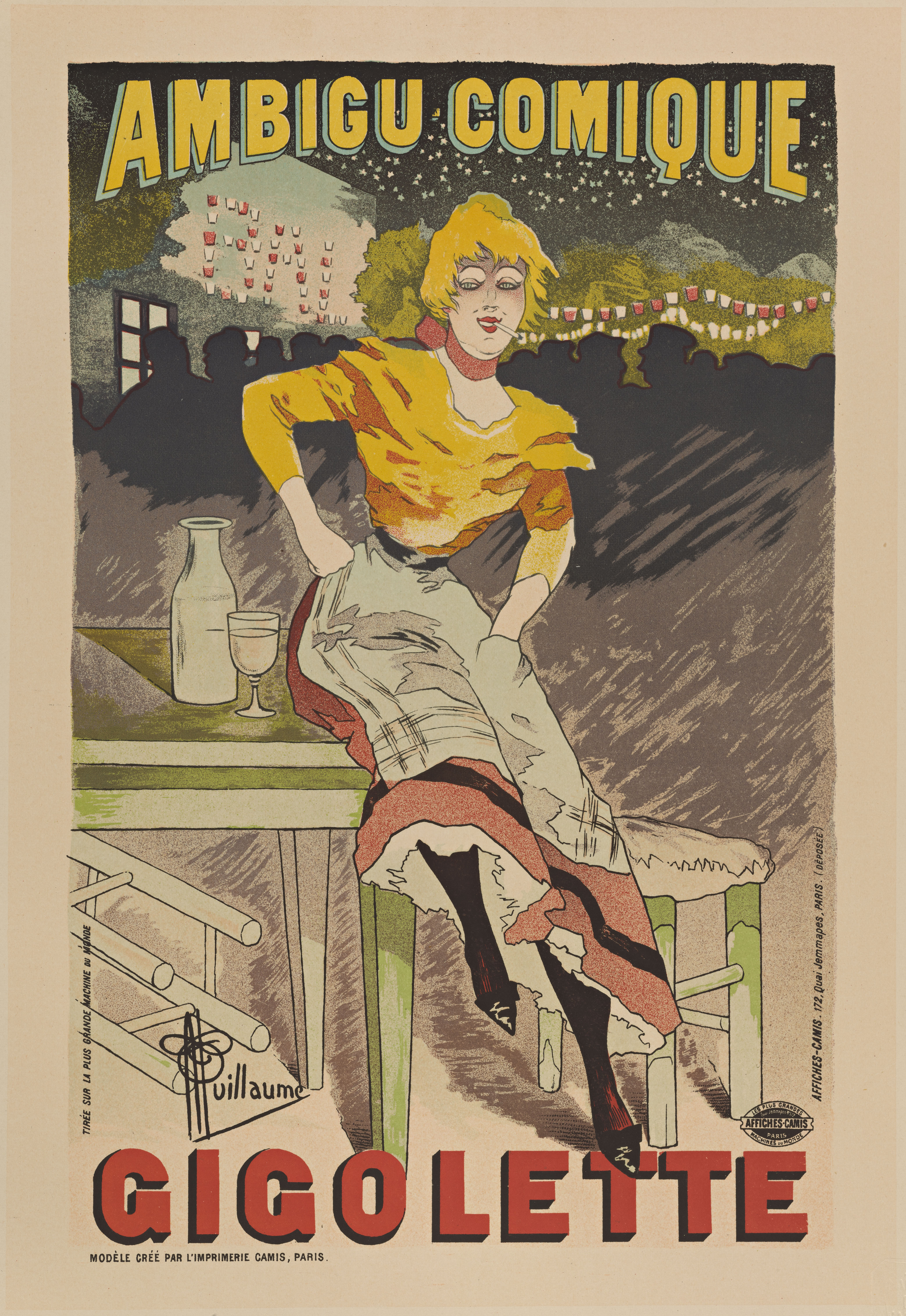
Poster for an 1896 production at the Theâtre

=== 20th century ===
In the 1920s, the building was briefly turned into a cinema. In 1954, the comedian Christian Casadesus reopened the Théâtre de l'Ambigu, and plays were staged there once again, by contemporary authors such as François Billetdoux and Roger Vitrac. In 1966, despite several demonstrations and a spectacular parade by the whole theatrical profession, the theatre was closed for good and demolished. The department of André Malraux, minister of culture, promised that the auditorium, then the whole building, would be preserved, when demolition works had already begun.

== See also ==
- Suzanne Lagier
