= Mazas Prison =

Prison in France

Coordinates: 48.8465°N 2.3742°E

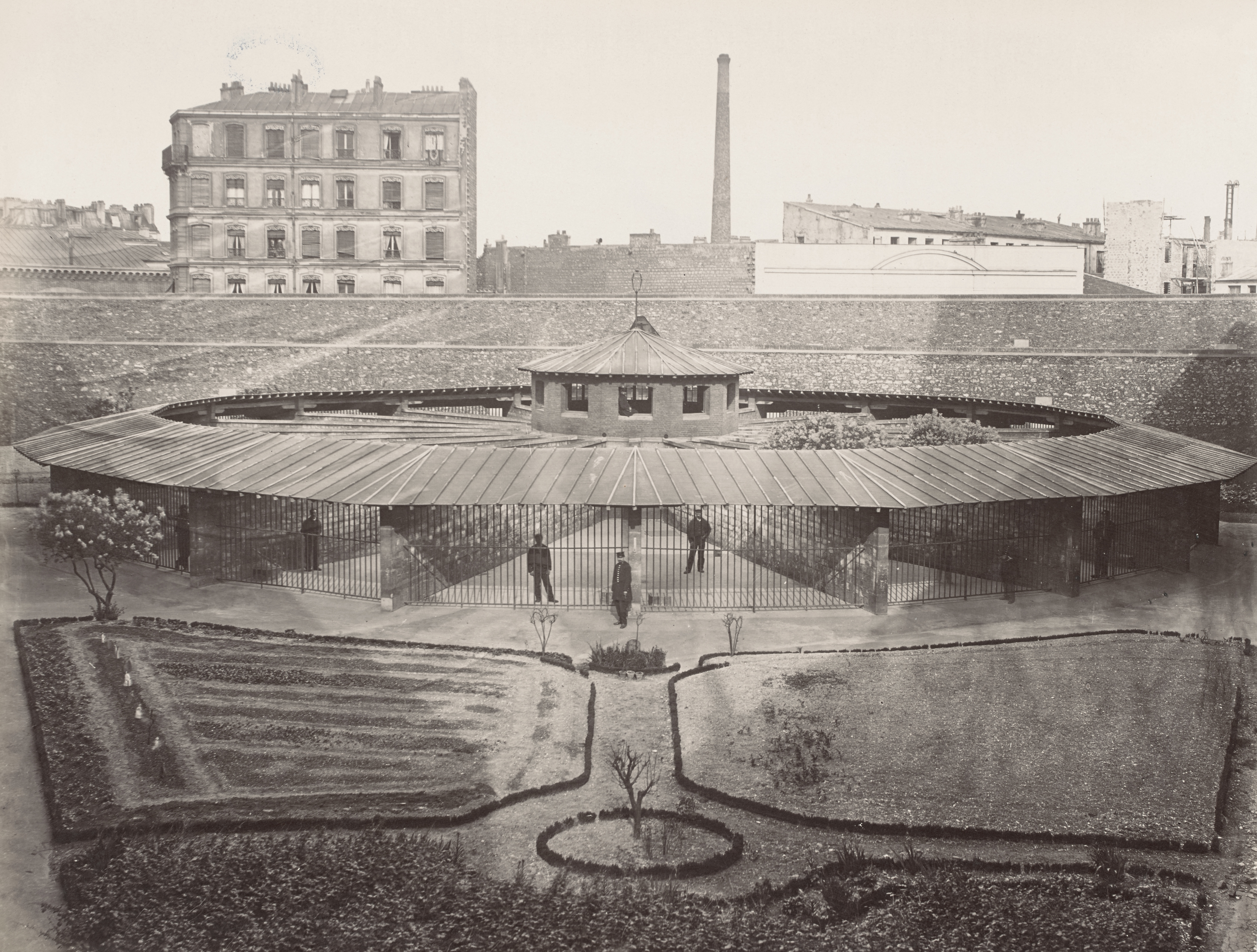
The Mazas Prison c. 1876–1880

The Mazas Prison (French: Prison Mazas) was a prison in Paris, France.

Designed by architects Émile Gilbert and Jean-François-Joseph Lecointe, it was inaugurated in 1850 and located near the Gare de Lyon, on the Diderot boulevard. It is mentioned in Les Miserables by Victor Hugo. The building was destroyed in 1900.
