= Cusin =

Cusin is a surname. Notable people with the surname include:

- Alphonse Cusin (1820–1894), French architect
- Marco Cusin (born 1985), Italian basketball player
- Rémi Cusin (born 1986), French cyclist
- Stefano Cusin (born 1968), Canadian-born Italian footballer and manager
