= Théâtre de la Gaîté =

Théâtre de la Gaîté may refer to:

- Théâtre de la Gaîté (boulevard du Temple), a former theatre in Paris (1759–1862)
- Théâtre de la Gaîté (rue Papin), a former theatre in Paris (1862–1989)
- La Gaîté Lyrique, a modern arts centre in Paris, opened in 2010, that incorporates parts of the old Théâtre de la Gaîté on rue Papin.
