= Théâtre de la Gaîté (boulevard du Temple) =

Former theatre on Boulevard du Temple in Paris, France, 1808–1862

- Théâtre de Nicolet (1759–1772); Grands-Danseurs du Roi (1772–1792)
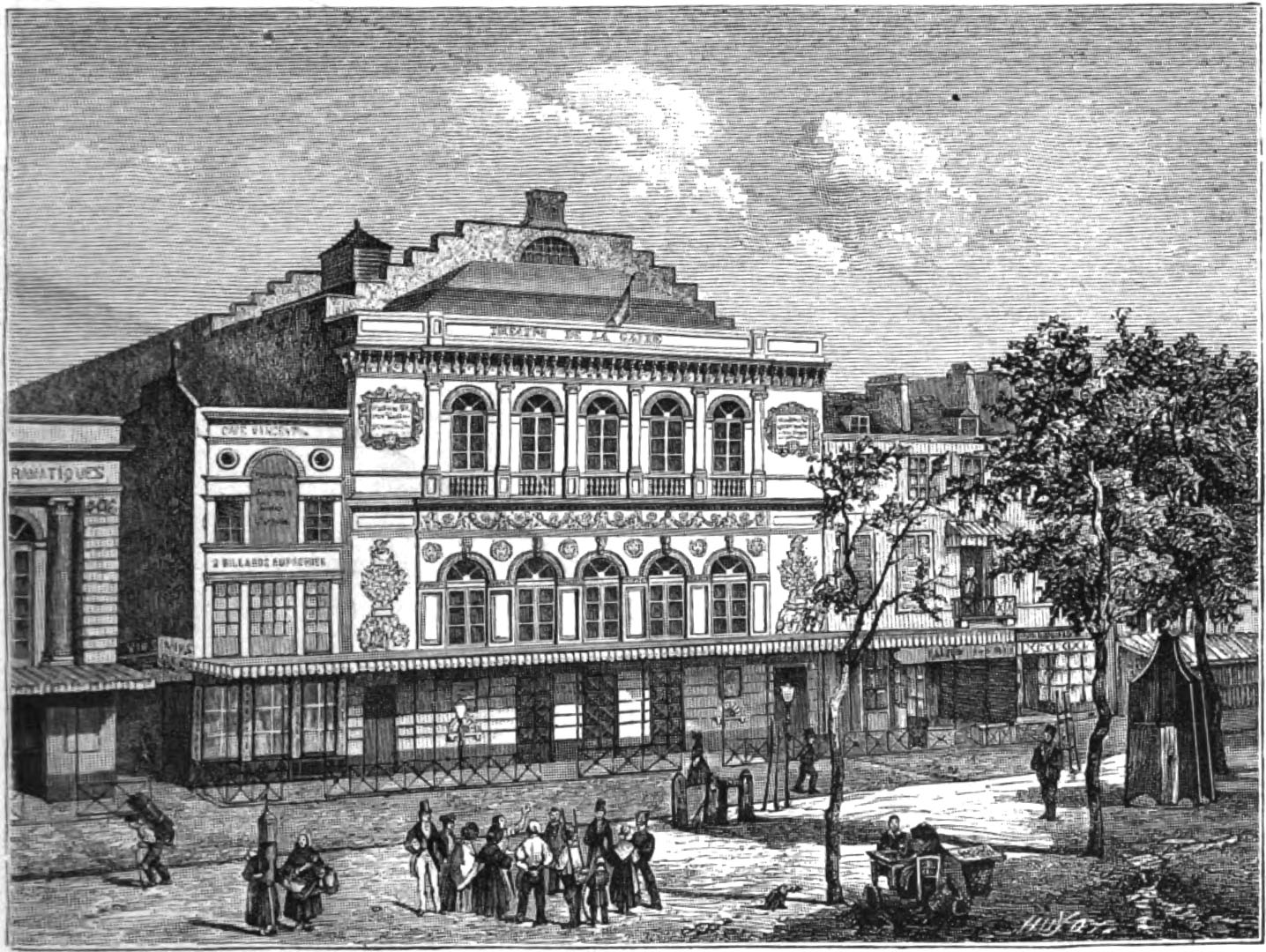
- The Théâtre de la Gaîté's fourth and last theatre on the boulevard du Temple, used from 1835 to 1862
- Interactive map of Théâtre de la Gaîté (boulevard du Temple)
- Address: 58 boulevard du Temple, 11th arrondissement (post 1860); Paris
- Coordinates: 48.8667°N 2.3653°E
- Capacity: 1,545 (1808 theatre); 1,800 (1835 theatre)

Construction
- Opened: 1759 (nearby, across the street)
- Demolished: c. 1862 (4th theatre)
- Rebuilt: 58 boulevard du Temple: 1762–4, 1808, 1835

The Théâtre de la Gaîté (French pronunciation: [teɑtʁ də la ɡɛte]), a former Parisian theatre company, was founded in 1759 on the boulevard du Temple by the celebrated Parisian fair-grounds showman Jean-Baptiste Nicolet as the Théâtre de Nicolet, ou des Grands Danseurs (pronounced [teɑtʁ də nikɔlɛ u de ɡʁɑ̃ dɑ̃sœʁ]). The company was invited to perform for the royal court of Louis XV in 1772 and thereafter took the name of Grands-Danseurs du Roi (pronounced [ɡʁɑ̃ dɑ̃sœʁ dy ʁwa]). However, with the fall of the monarchy and the founding of the French First Republic in 1792, the name was changed to the less politically risky Théâtre de la Gaîté. The company's theatre on the boulevard du Temple was replaced in 1764 and 1808, and again in 1835 due to a fire. As a result of Haussmann's renovation of Paris, the company relocated to a new theatre on the rue Papin in 1862, and the 1835 theatre (pictured) was subsequently demolished.

== Nicolet moves from the fair to the boulevard ==
In 1759 a new Lieutenant General of Police, Antoine de Sartine, took office, and Jean-Baptiste Nicolet, an actor who specialized in playing the role of Harlequin, and one of the foremost producers of popular entertainments at the Parisian fairs, took the opportunity to obtain permission to begin performing in a rented theatre on the boulevard du Temple, although he also continued to present at the fairs until 1789. The boulevard, which was 30 meters in width, much greater than a typical Parisian street of the time, ran from the Porte Saint-Martin at the northern edge of the city to the Porte Saint-Antoine in the east. It had been created on top of defensive earthworks erected by Charles V in the 14th century and in 1668, during the reign of Louis XIV, turned into a promenade with four rows of trees. A popular spot, not least because its elevation afforded good views of the windmills of Montmartre and the countryside to the north of the city, it remained mostly unpaved until 1778. The French term boulevard actually derives from Middle Dutch bolwerc (English: bulwark).

== Nicolet's first boulevard theatre ==
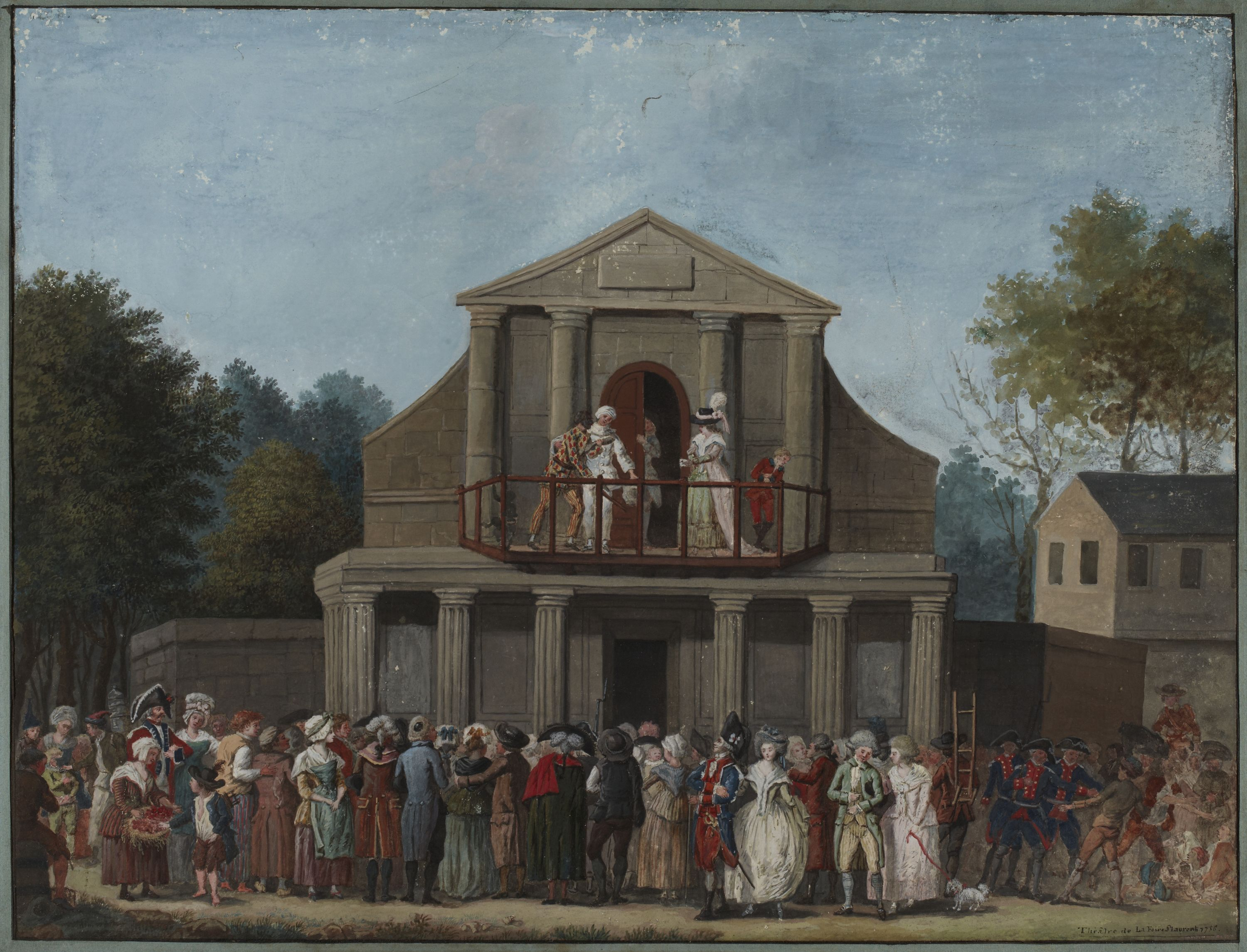
According to Howarth this is Nicolet's first theatre on the boulevard du Temple (before 1762). Other authors have identified it as Nicolet's theatre at the Foire Saint-Laurent. A parade, a short comic entertainment designed to entice passersby to buy tickets, is being performed on the balcony. Gouache, Musée Carnavalet.

Nicolet's small boulevard theatre had been put up by Antoine Fouré for the purpose of presenting spectacle mécanique in the manner of Servandoni. The term spectacle mécanique often referred to puppet shows, but in this case it more likely meant a small stage with scenic effects and cut-out flats as moving figures. When Nicolet acquired the use of the theatre he reconstructed it to suit his needs. One of the major advantages of the new location, besides its popularity, was that performances could be presented year round, rather than intermittently, as was the case at the fairs. Thus Nicolet could begin to compete with the more established theatres in the heart of Paris.

He had a license for acrobatics and rope-dancing, but also began adding pantomimes and dramatic sketches which were typically used in the breaks between the other acts. These often included incidental music in the form of vaudevilles (popular songs supplied with new lyrics). Since the pieces with spoken dialogue and singing by the actors fell outside what was permitted by his license, Nicolet sometimes received reminders not to present such works. These admonitions were delivered by the Lieutenant of Police at the instigation of the privileged royal theatres, primarily the Comédie-Française, which presented plays in French at their theatre on the rue Neuve-des-Fossés, and the Comédie-Italienne, which presented primarily opéras-comiques in French and sometimes opera buffa in Italian at the Hôtel de Bourgogne. Despite these restrictions, Nicolet's theatre was so successful, that by 1761 he employed 30 actors, 60 dancers, and 20 musicians, and had a repertoire of around 250 short dramatic pieces.

== Salle des Grands Danseurs ==
Nicolet's financial success was such that in 1762 he was able to apply for permission to construct a much larger and more substantial theatre. He leased a plot of land located further along the boulevard on the northeast side, away from the city. The site had previously been part of the moat, which had been filled in, but was still extremely boggy and needed to be drained, raised, and leveled before the wooden structure could be built. The new theatre, referred to as the Salle des Grands Danseurs, opened in 1764, and was even more successful at attracting large audiences, and "on Sundays, it was by no means unusual to see a couple of thousand spectators besieging the doors." Rivals during this period were few; those who tried, failed to compete and quickly departed.

== Toussaint-Gaspard Taconet ==
One of the most important actors and writers for the Théâtre de Nicolet was Toussaint-Gaspard Taconet. Taconet had started out as a joiner's apprentice but had later become a stagehand and prompter at the Opéra-Comique, which at that time was presenting exclusively at the Parisian fairs. He also wrote and appeared in several pieces with Nicolet's troupe at the fair theatres, including L'ombre de Vadé at the Foire Saint-Germain in 1757. In 1762 the Opéra-Comique was suddenly merged into the Comédie-Italienne and moved into that company's theatre at the Hôtel de Bourgogne. As a result, Taconet left the Opéra-Comique and joined Nicolet's troupe on the boulevard du Temple. There he wrote a whole series of coarse but hilarious comedy sketches, some of which skirted obscenity, and in which he often appeared as an actor, usually as a working man, typically a cobbler, and a drunkard. The first was Adieux de l'Opéra-Comique (8 October 1761). Other titles included L' Impromptu du jour de l'an (1762), L' École villageoise (1763), Le Choix imprévu (1764), Ragotin ou l' arrivée au tripot (1765), Gilles amoureux (1766), L' Homme aux deux femmes (1767), and Le Mari prudent et la femme étourdie (1768). Probably his most successful was Les Ecosseuses de la halle (1768), which continued to be presented up to the time of the French Revolution. Taconet became so popular and famous that he acquired the title of Molière des Boulevards. One of his most well-known expressions was "Je te m'éprise comme un verre d'eau" ("I scorn you like a glass of water"). An obituary in Bachaumont's Mémoires secrets, dated 21 January 1775 shortly after Taconet's death on 29 December 1774 (probably caused by excessive drinking), described him as "the soul of Nicolet's theatre".

== Turco and other attractions ==
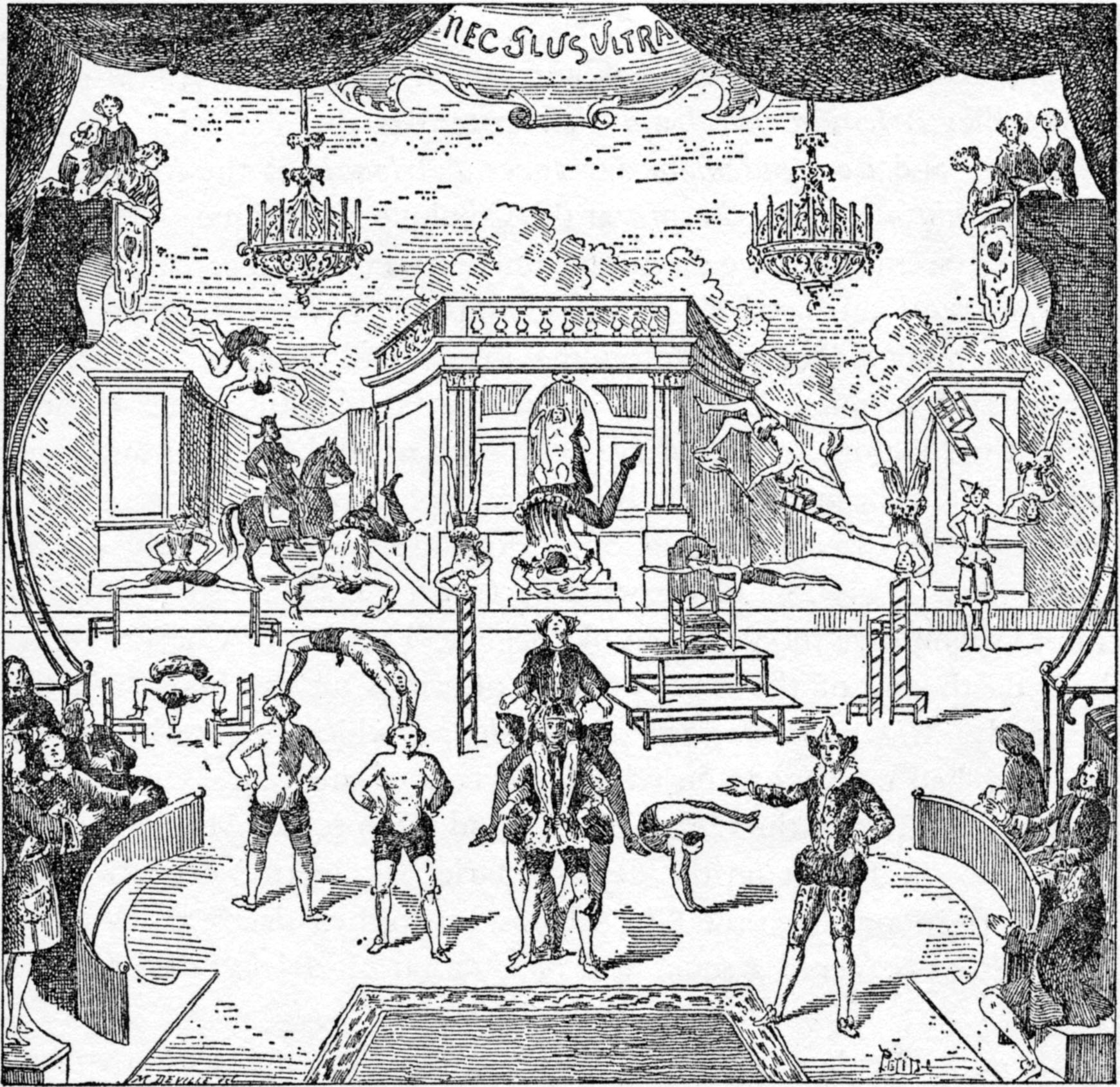
An entr'acte at Nicolet's theatre

About 1767 one of the Nicolet's star attractions was a monkey named Turco who would lead parades along the boulevard to the theatre, then take the stage and enact current events. Nicolet once dressed the monkey in a dressing gown, nightcap, and slippers, similar to the costume worn by the Comédie-Française comic actor Molé, and trained the animal to imitate the actor's gestures. To the further delight of the audience Turco frequently scampered up to the ladies' boxes to sit on the railing and beg for candies. Another attraction was a group of Spanish acrobats, one of whose members danced blindfolded, spinning and dashing about on a stage strewn with eggs, none of which were disturbed. Guillaume Depping has described Nicolet's method: "This man, who has made a name for himself in the art he professed, had a maxim by which he always squared his conduct before the public. It was never to astound the audience but to hold them in suspense by a series of efforts, the gradation of which should be judiciously managed. With him every evolution led to another more astonishing, and the series closed with the most arduous and wonderful feat he knew." Such displays gave rise to the saying "De plus en plus fort, comme chez Nicolet" ("From one excess to the next, like Nicolet").

== Audinot ==
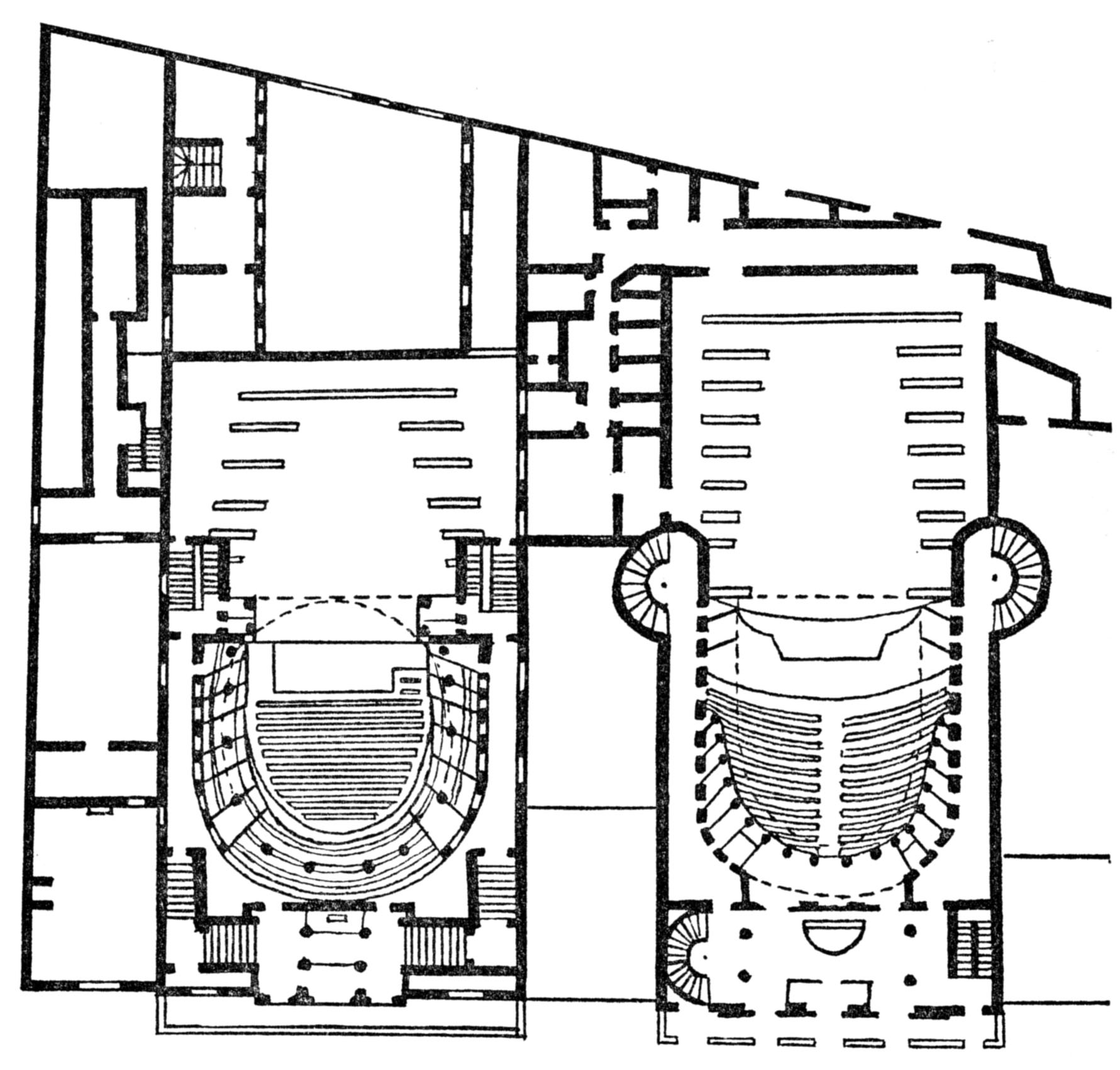
Plans of the Ambigu-Comique (left), which opened in 1769, and the Gaîté (right), which opened in 1764

In 1769 the competition on the boulevard du Temple began to increase. Another fairground entrepreneur Nicolas-Médard Audinot built a theatre next to Nicolet's, which opened on 9 July 1769. Audinot, who had created a new and highly successful marionette show at the Foire Saint-Germain, brought the puppets to his new theatre and opened on 9 July 1769. He also obtained permission to use child actors at the boulevard theatre. The repertoire gradually included dramatic works, mostly comedies, frequently vulgar, with songs similar to vaudevilles. The genre of these pieces was ambiguous, thus the theatre became known as the Théâtre de l'Ambigu-Comique. Audinot had quickly built a more substantial theatre on the same site in 1770, which however already needed to be replaced by 1786.

Both the Gaîté and the Ambigu-Comique theatres had a smaller number of boxes for privileged clientele than other Parisian theatres. These were separated by only half partitions that were more steeply angled toward the stage. The boxes usually found at the rear of a theatre were replaced with galleries of benches which seated more people. According to McCormick, "this type of arrangement, ensuring the largest possible audience with a good view of the stage, belongs to the popular theatres, where the central concern is what is on the stage, not who is in the audience."

== Les Grands-Danseurs du Roi ==
In 1772 Nicolet's company (and that of Audinot) were summoned to perform at the Château de Choisy for Louis XV and Madame du Barry. The performance found favor, and Nicolet's company earned the privilege of calling themselves the Grands-Danseurs du Roi. The enhancement in status enabled Nicolet to better resist the restrictions imposed by the royal theatres. The death of Louis XV in 1774 and the appointment of Jean-Charles-Pierre Lenoir to the position of Lieutenant of Police resulted in a slackening in the enforcement of the restrictions. Lenoir had a more tolerant attitude toward the theatres on the boulevard and at the fairs, since he regarded them as a necessary and comparatively innocuous amusement for the continually increasing working-class population of the capital. In fact, it became a requirement for the entrepreneurs of the boulevard to maintain their fairground operations, otherwise the crowds at the fairs would significantly decrease. Moreover, the enormous success of boulevard theatres provided a substantial portion of the droit des pauvres, a tax imposed on all theatres, which was now seen as indispensable to the hospitals and other charities that received it. Thus, the number of dramatic pieces performed at Nicolet's boulevard theatre steadily grew, especially pantomimes, the latter eventually developing into the early 19th-century melodrama.

As Nicolet's audience grew, the more he could afford to improve the quality of the presentations, which resulted in even greater demand and a concomitant increase in the yield at the box office. By 1779 Bachaumont's Mémoires secrets reported that "it can scarcely be credited to what heights of industry this mountebank has ascended; his theatre today rivals the Opera itself and surpasses it in some respects: the stage machinery, admirably adjusted, functions very precisely, the scenery is magnificent, the costumes in the best taste, the production not lacking in splendour, the actors numerous and excellently directed. The Opera, jealous of this success, has tried to have it suppressed; but the sagacious magistrate who presides over the police and has particular charge of the minor theatres has felt it only right to defend Nicolet against such unjust demands, all the more because the director has invested heavily in his theatre, and it is natural that he should get some return."

== Théâtre de la Gaîté ==
With the fall of the monarchy and the founding of the French First Republic in 1792, Nicolet and his company found it advisable to change the name Grands-Danseurs du Roi to the less politically risky Théâtre de la Gaîté. When Nicolet retired in 1795, he leased the theatre to Louis-François Ribié, who renamed it Théâtre de l'Emulation, but when Ribié left in 1797, the name reverted to Gaîté.

In 1807 the Théâtre de la Gaîté survived the severe reduction in the number of theatres in Paris under the decrees of Napoleon, becoming one of the four secondary theatres, but the authorities declared the building unsafe. Nicolet's widow carried out some emergency repairs and built a larger theatre seating 1,545 spectators in 1808, which became one of the major theatres of Paris. Beginning that year many of the popular melodramas of René Charles Guilbert de Pixérécourt were performed there, and he was the company's director from 1824 to 1835. These melodramas were generally tragedies, but even the most mournful scenes frequently included buffoonery and songs. Louis Alexandre Piccinni was the musical director from 1818 to 1831. Pixérécourt's theatre burned in 1835 and was replaced with an even larger theatre which was used until 1862.

== Move to the rue Papin ==
During Haussmann's renovation of Paris the theatres on the boulevard du Temple (by then nicknamed Boulevard du Crime) were slated for demolition to make way the present Place de la République. A new theatre for the Théâtre de la Gaîté was built on the rue Papin, and the company relocated there in 1862. In the late 1980s, much of the 1862 theatre (except for the facade, entryway and foyer) was demolished during the construction of an amusement center, which quickly failed. Between December 2004 and November 2010, the City of Paris built a digital arts and modern music centre on the site, La Gaîté Lyrique, which restored and incorporated the surviving historic front section of the old building.

== See also ==
- Théâtre de la Gaîté (rue Papin)
- La Gaîté Lyrique
- Théâtre de la Gaîté-Montparnasse
