= La Gaîté Lyrique =

French recording studio, media research lab and arts centre

Coordinates: 48°51′59.5″N 2°21′12″E

- Théâtre de la Gaîté, Théâtre de la Gaîté-Lyrique
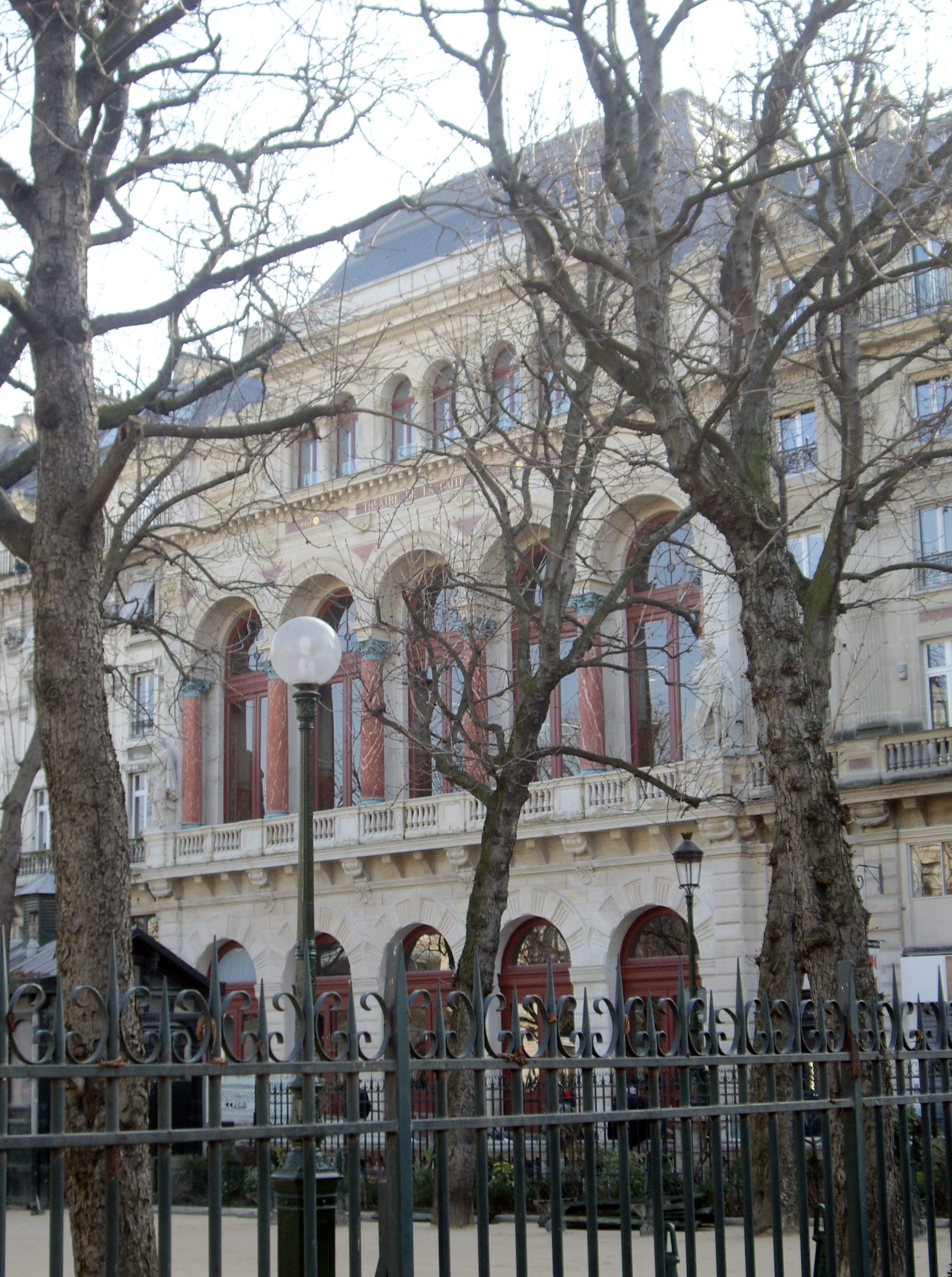
- Facade of the former Théâtre de la Gaîté on the rue Papin, now part of La Gaîté Lyrique
- Interactive map of La Gaîté Lyrique
- Address: 3–5 rue Papin, 3rd arrondissement Paris
- Operator: Marc Dondey (General/Artistic Director)

Construction
- Opened: 2010
- Architect: Manuelle Gautrand (refurbishment)

La Gaîté Lyrique (French: [la ɡɛte liʁik]) is a digital arts and modern music centre opened by the City of Paris in December 2010, located at 3-5 rue Papin in the 3rd arrondissement.

The centre is on the site of the former Théâtre de la Gaîté, incorporating the facade, entrance and foyer of the original theatre. The auditorium of the theatre was demolished in 1989 for an amusement park.

The refurbishment lasted from 2004 to 2011 under the architect Manuelle Gautrand. The General/Artistic Director was Jérôme Delormas. The venue is directed by Marc Dondey since 2016.

Since December 2024, it has been occupied by hundreds of migrants.

== History ==
Following Haussmann's modernization of Paris and the destruction of the theatres on the boulevard du Temple, the last of a succession of playhouses called the Théâtre de la Gaîté was built in the rue Papin. It opened on 3 September 1862. The building was designed by the architects Jacques-Ignace Hittorff and Alphonse Cusin, with an 1800-seat auditorium decorated by Félix Jobbé-Duval.

Concentrating on operettas, it also became known as the Gaîté-Lyrique and was at its height during the Second French Empire. Jacques Offenbach was its director from 1873 to 1874,

After the Second World War, the theatre enjoyed success under its directors Henri Montjoye and his wife Germaine Roger. In 1974, the Carré Silvia-Monfort and the first circus school based themselves here for a time. The theatre became bankrupt and closed.

In the early 1980s the dome of the main auditorium was threatening to collapse, and it was reinforced with concrete. During the following years it was largely destroyed and transformed into an amusement park, Planète magique, by Jean Chalopin. The main auditorium, holding 1800, and the orchestra pit large enough for 60 musicians were among the parts of the building that were lost. The amusement park was only open for a few weeks.

== General facilities ==
La Gaîté-Lyrique is 35 metres wide, 60 metres in length, and 26 metres tall with a total of 9,500 square metres of usable floor space. The building has five levels accessible to the public and 2 private levels at the top, which include shops for artists. There are 5 elevators and 3 service elevators. Other areas include the reception, the historical foyer (above the reception), three performance venues, exhibition spaces, a resource centre, a video gaming area, artist spaces, and a boutique. Most of these areas are designed to be adaptable to new uses and include movable floor and wall elements. Small movable and recombinable dodecahedral units, called "éclaireuses", are available for use as, for example, dressing rooms, offices, technical annexes, installation spaces, or even parts of stage sets.

Since the building is surrounded by over 100 residences, acoustic isolation was a high priority. It was designed using the "box within a box" principle. The performance spaces, being the most sonically intensive, were placed in the center and are surrounded by three successive layers of more external spaces. Utility spaces and vertical passages are located between the two outer layers. There is only one "ceremonial" staircase connecting the ground floor and the first floor. Otherwise each floor is as large as possible to provide the greatest flexibility in the use of the space.

== Performance venues ==
The Large Hall (Grande Salle) is above the main floor at the back of the building, has a capacity of about 750 standing places or 308 when seated. It includes telescopic tiers (bleachers) for seating which can be folded away sideways. Projection screens can be mounted at various levels on any of the four walls, and a large variety audience and stage setups can be accommodated. There are also four large screens the size of each wall which allows for the possibility of total audience immersion in a projected space. The exterior is covered with mirrored panels, rendering it instantly recognisable and capable of complementing installed artwork.

The Small Hall (Petite Salle), located on the lowest level at the back of the building, can accommodate 70 seated and 150 standing places and can be used in conjunction with the exhibition areas or as a separate audio/visual venue. The walls can be taken apart, and the floor panels can be mounted at different levels to create various platforms and tiers. The colour scheme is in shades of gray so as not to conflict with the artists' installations.

The Auditorium is more traditional with 130 fixed seats, a projector and control room, and a 5-metre screen at the bottom front of the hall. It is located between a large exposition space on the lower level at the front of the building and the petite salle at the back. There are entrances on the ground and first floors, and it is directly accessible from the rue Papin.

== Resource centre ==
The resource centre functions as a modern library. It is located at the back of the building, above the Petite Salle and below the Grande Salle. It has a capacity of 100 and 14 consultation stations. The collections include 1500 books, 200 periodicals, 150 art catalogues, and other material on topics such as digital art, contemporary music, new art technologies, video games, dance, set design, street art, skating, and graffiti, and also includes digitized periodicals, documents, playlists, blog lists, and other items relating to guest artists and programs, as well as video games. There are also facilities for listening. The resource centre also presents workshops, educational courses and training in information retrieval.

== On-going occupation by migrants ==
Around 400 foreign migrants are currently staging a protest where they refuse to leave the building. The situation is still on-going after three months. The occupation of the cultural centre began on 10 December 2024 after the theater gave free tickets to several hundred refugees, the asylum seekers, many of whom are of unknown age and thus are not able to be granted protections by the state, refused to leave, and the theater is now facing the possibility of bankruptcy.

== See also ==
- Théâtre de la Gaîté (disambiguation)
