= Toussaint-Gaspard Taconet =

Toussaint-Gaspard Taconet (July 1730 – 29 December 1774) was an 18th-century French comic actor, the main character in Jean-Baptiste Nicolet's plays. He made his debut as machinist at the Opéra de Paris, then was a prompter at the Comédie-Française and the Opéra-Comique.

He had many farces and comedies presented and published.
