= Anne-Antoinette Nicolet =

French actor and theatre director

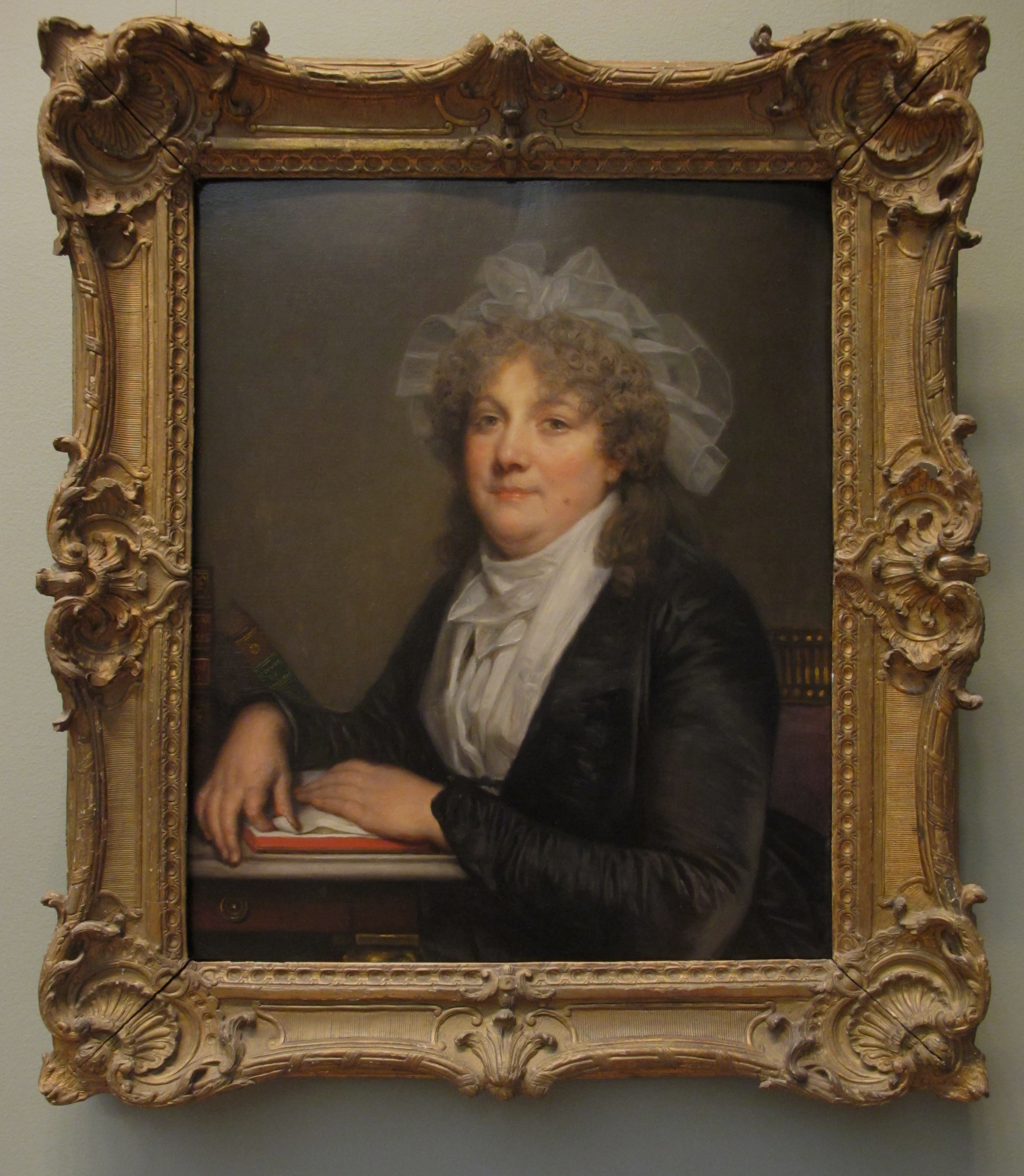
Madame Jean-Baptiste Nicolet (Anne Antoinette Desmoulins, 1743–1817) MET 55.205.2 1 copy

Anne-Antoinette Nicolet (French pronunciation: [an ɑ̃twanɛt nikɔlɛ]; 1743-1817), was a French actress and theatre director.

She was the director of the travelling theatre Theatre des Grand-Danseurs du Roi (after 1792 Theatre de la Galté) between 1780 and 1807 (except 1795–96).
