= Fontaines de la Concorde =

Monumental fountains in Paris, France

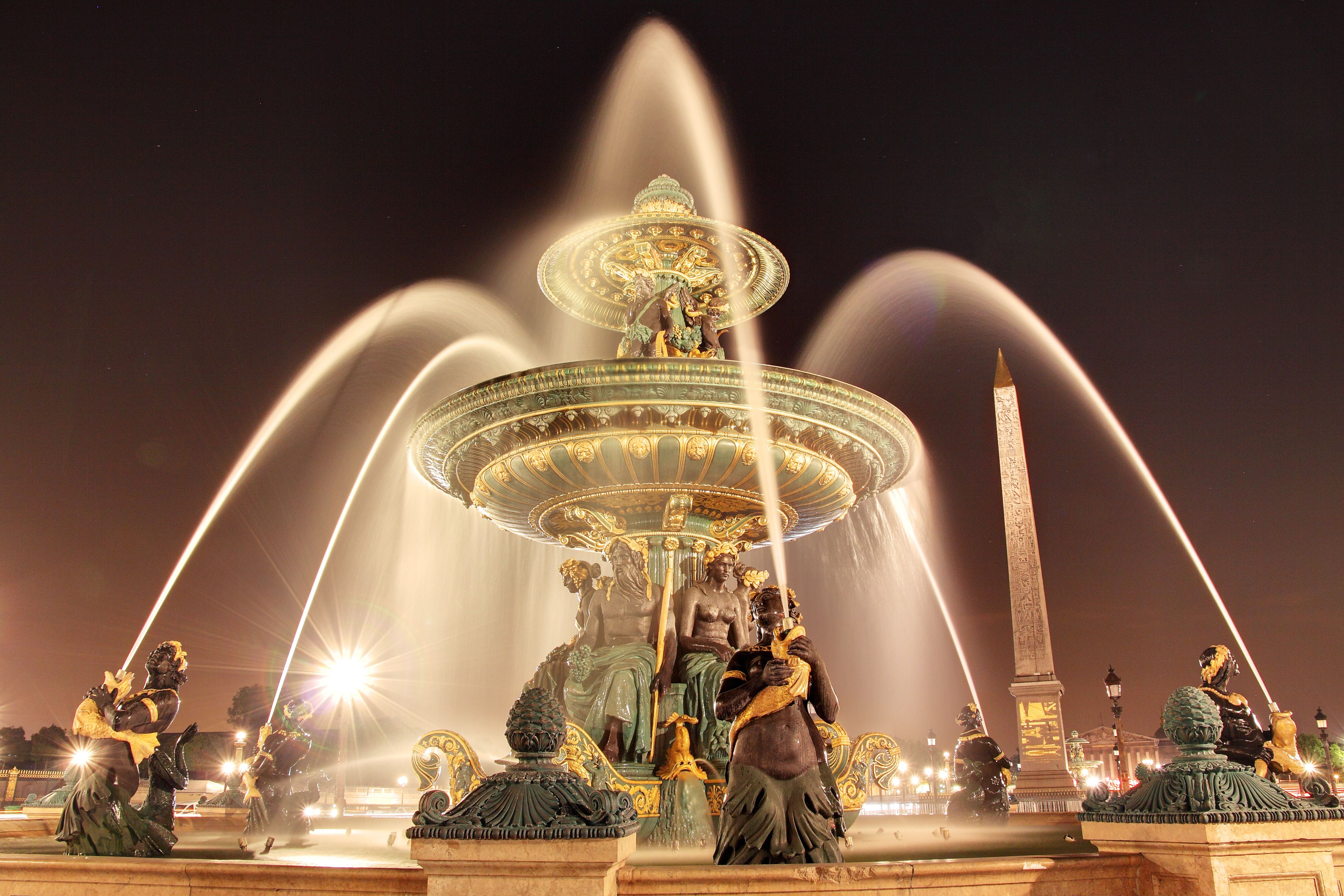
- Fontaine de la Concorde at night

- Location within Paris
- Arrondissement: 8th
- Coordinates: 48°51′56″N 2°19′16″E

Construction
- Construction start: 1833
- Completion: 1840

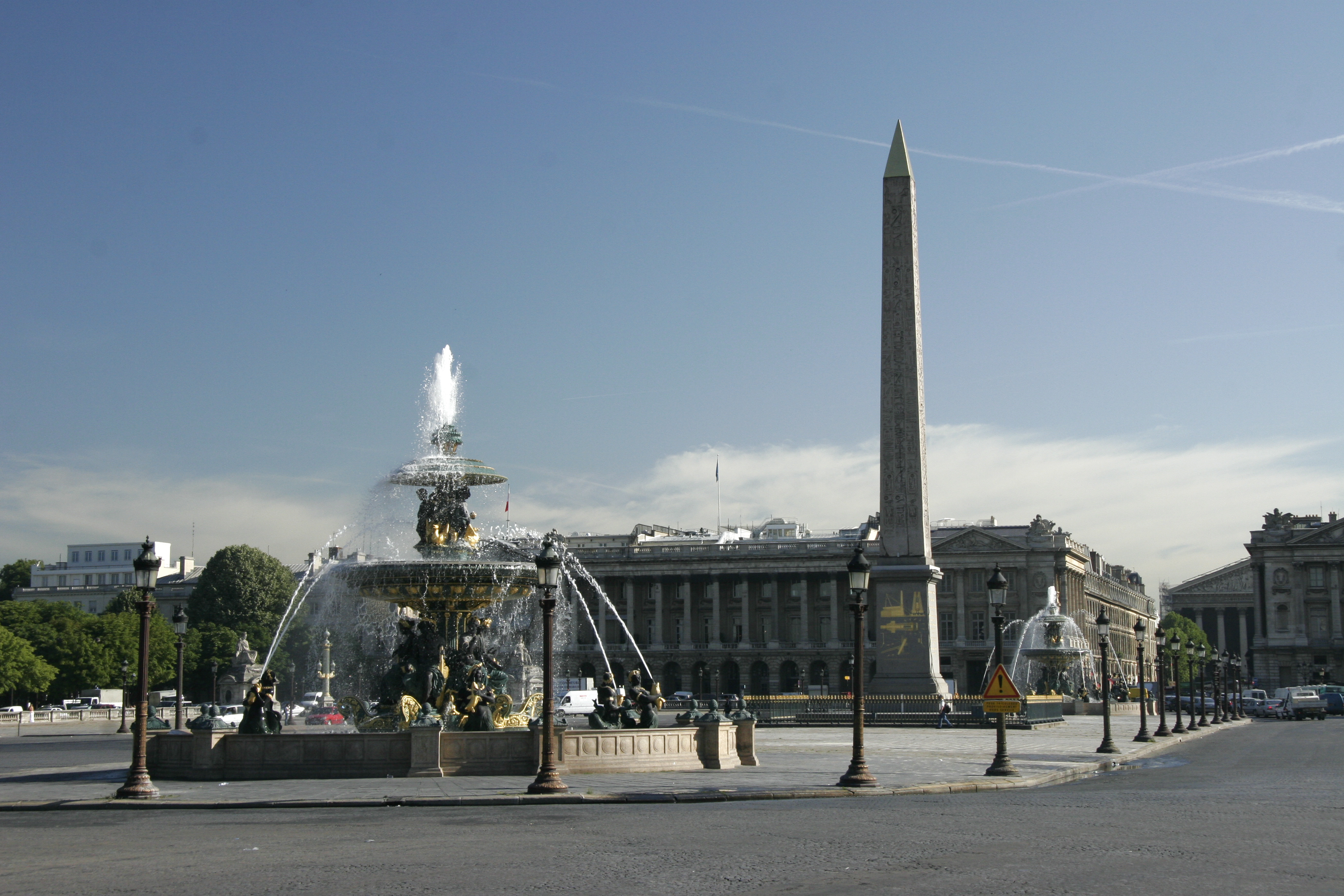
The two Fontaines de la Concorde, with the fountain of Maritime Navigation in the foreground

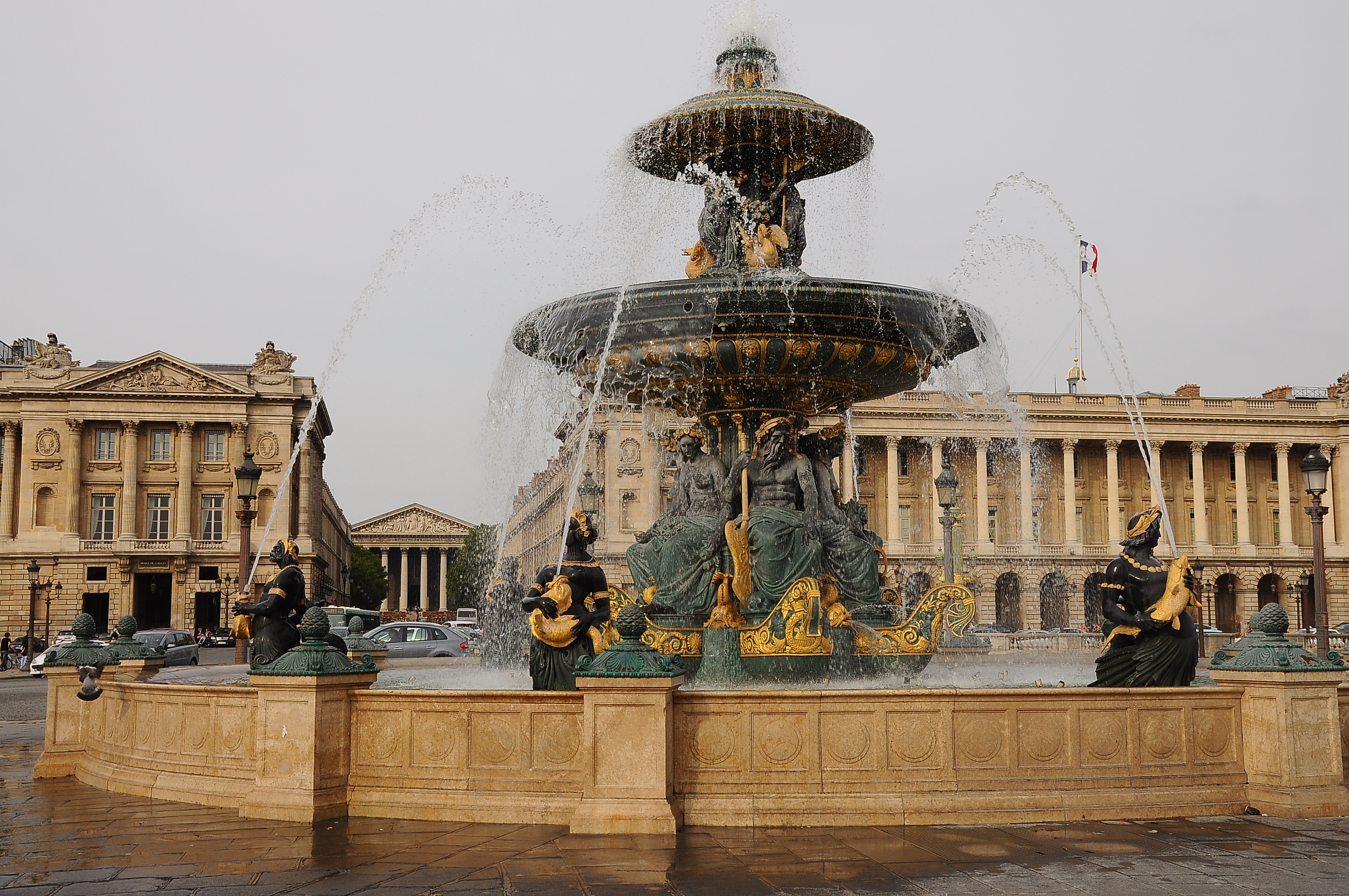
Fountain of River Commerce and Navigation

The Fontaines de la Concorde are two monumental fountains located in the Place de la Concorde in the center of Paris. They were designed by Jacques Ignace Hittorff, and completed in 1840 during the reign of King Louis-Philippe. The south fountain commemorates the maritime commerce and industry of France, and the north fountain commemorates navigation and commerce on the rivers of France.

== History ==
Before the French Revolution, during the period 1753–1772, when the square was called Place Louis XV, the architect Ange-Jacques Gabriel designed a plan for a monumental statue of Louis XV with two fountains, but because of a lack of sufficient water, it was never carried out. Gabriel did complete the building of the Ministry of the Navy overlooking the square - its presence later influenced the choice of themes for the Fontaines de la Concorde.

During the French Revolution, the square was renamed Place de la Revolution, the guillotine was placed there, and King Louis XVI and thousands of others were beheaded near the site of the present fountains. In 1795, after the Reign of Terror ended, the square was renamed the Place de la Concorde. After the restoration of the Monarchy in 1816 the square was renamed in the Memory of King Louis XVI.

The completion of the Canal de l'Ourcq in 1824, bringing water from outside the city to the Center of Paris, made it possible to build new fountains in the Place de la Concorde. In 1829, during the rule of King Charles X, the city sponsored a competition for a new plan for the square, which was to include no less than four fountains. One of the entrants in the competition was Jacques Ignace Hittorff, a German by birth, who had previously designed decorations for festivals, funerals, and the 1825 coronation of Charles X. The plan of Hittorff featured four fountains in four quadrants surrounding an equestrian statue of Louis XVI. His plan was not selected.

After the 1830 July Revolution, the new King, Louis-Philippe, renamed the square Place de la Concorde and rejected the earlier project for the Place. In 1831, when the Ottoman Empire's viceroy of Egypt, Mohammed Ali, gave the King the gift of an obelisk dating from the time of Ramses II from Luxor, Louis-Philippe selected Hittorff to design a setting for the obelisk in time for the 1833 July festival, intended to commemorate the anniversary of his rule. Shortly afterwards Louis-Philippe gave him a commission to redesign the entire square.

Hittorff worked on the design for the square and for four fountains from 1833 to 1840, consulting closely with Claude Philibert Barthelot Rambuteau, the Prefect of the Seine. The principal influence on his fountain designs were the twin fountains in Piazza San Pietro in Rome, which also are placed on either side on an obelisk, and which Hittdorff had seen on a visit to Rome in the 1820s. Another influence was Piazza Navona in Rome, where two fountains were placed on either side of an obelisk. Like the fountains of Piazza Navona, the Fontaines de la Concorde were placed on an axis that connected the Church of the Madeleine and the Rue Royale to the north and the bridge to the Palais Bourbon to the south.

Twelve different sculptors worked on the statuary of the fountains, closely supervised by Hittorff, who made sure that the entire ensemble would be harmonious and balanced. A prominent feature of the design of both fountains was a mushroom-shaped cap above the central vasque. Water was to jet from the top of the cap and then cascade downward into a circular vasque, then down into a large circular basin below. The major figures of the fountains were made of cast iron, florentined, or painted with bronze and gold paint. The smaller figures of the tritons and nereids were made of bronze.

Between 1833 and 1840, Hittdorff modified the plans several times. In 1835, when a government committee reported that the water supply would not be sufficient for four new fountains, he reduced the number to two. The obelisk was put in place on the square on October 25, 1836. Both fountains were completed in May, 1840.

In 1862–63, the fountains were restored, and the bronze and gold paint was replaced with a bronze coating.

During the siege of Paris the fountains were damaged due to artillery shelling from Prussian forces.

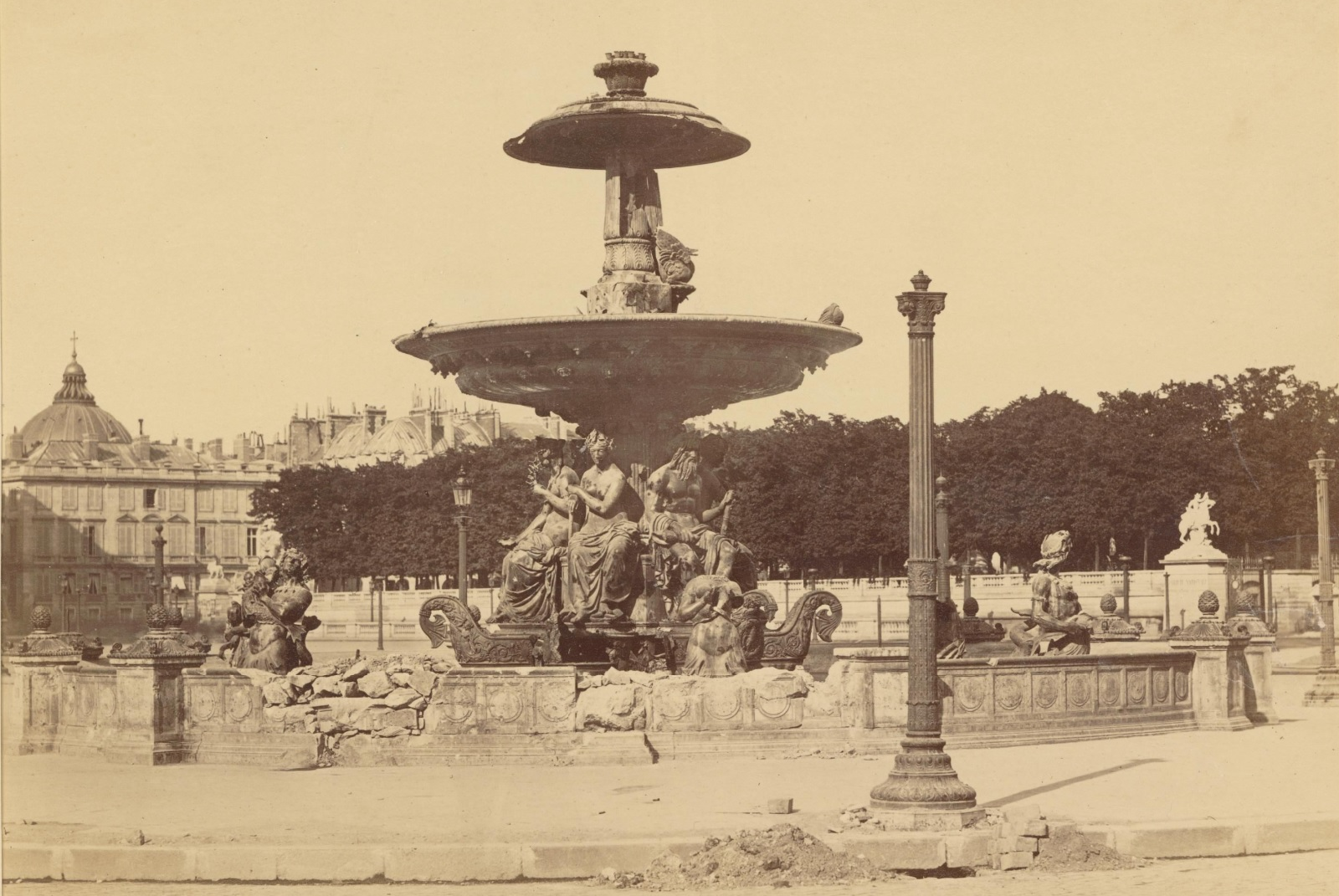
Fountaine des Mers, post artillery shelling during Siege of Paris, circa 1871

== Sculptors ==
The sculptors who worked on the fountain were:

- Auguste-Hyacinthe Debay (The Atlantic and the Mediterranean)
- Antoine Desboeufs (Coral and Fish)
- Achille-Joseph-Étienne Valois (Shells and Pearls)
- Isidore-Hippolyte Brion (Maritime navigation, Astronomy and Commerce)
- Jean-François-Théodore Gechter (The Rhône and the Rhine)
- François-Gaspard Lanno (Flowers and Fruit)
- Honoré-Jean Husson (Wheat and Grapes)
- Jean-Jacques Feuchère (River Navigation, Industry and Agriculture)
- Jean-Jacques Elshoecht, Louis-Parfait Merlieux, Antonin-Marie Moine (tritons and neriads).

== Symbolism ==
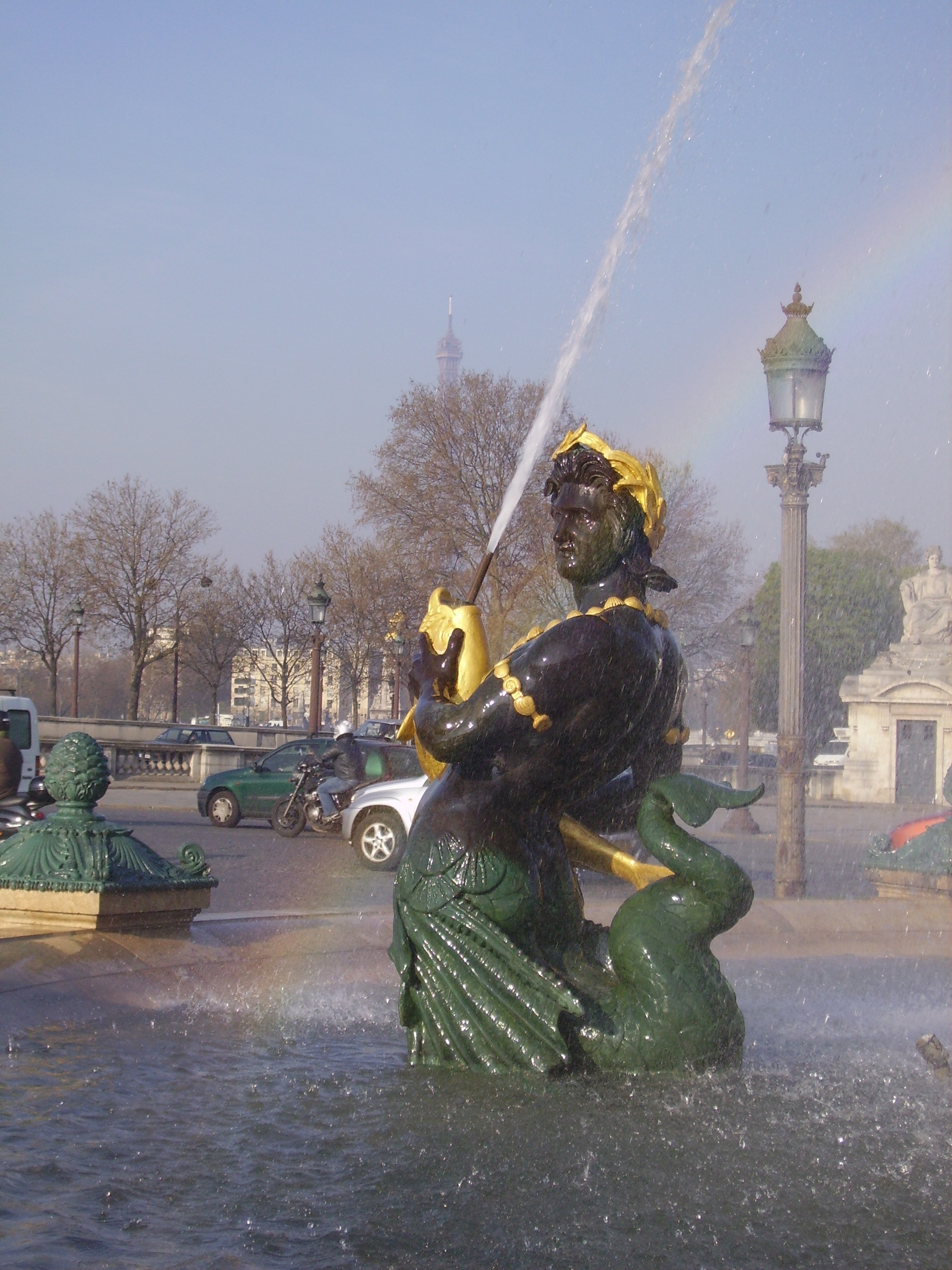
Fontaines de la Concorde (detail)

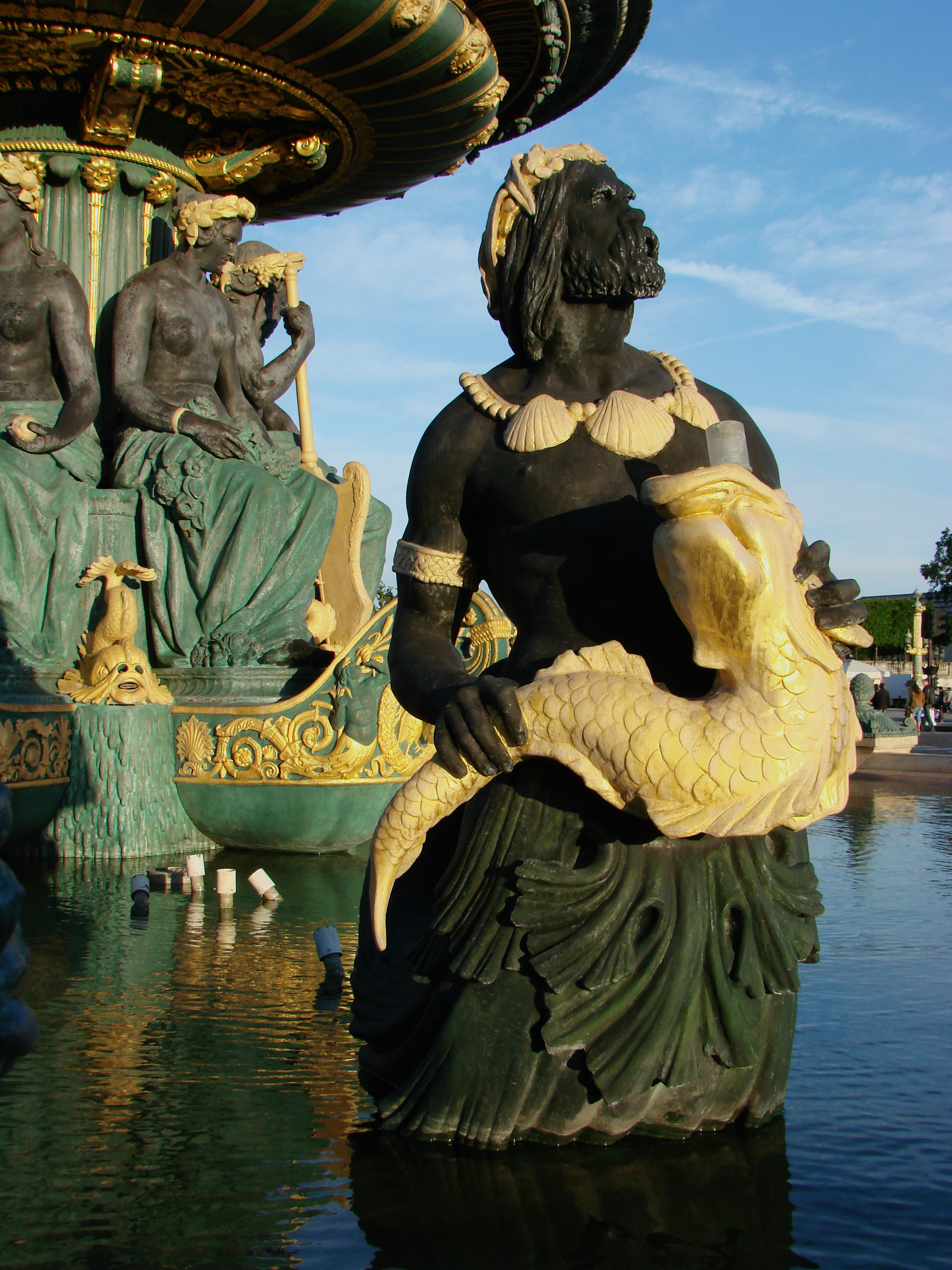
Fontaines de la Concorde (detail)

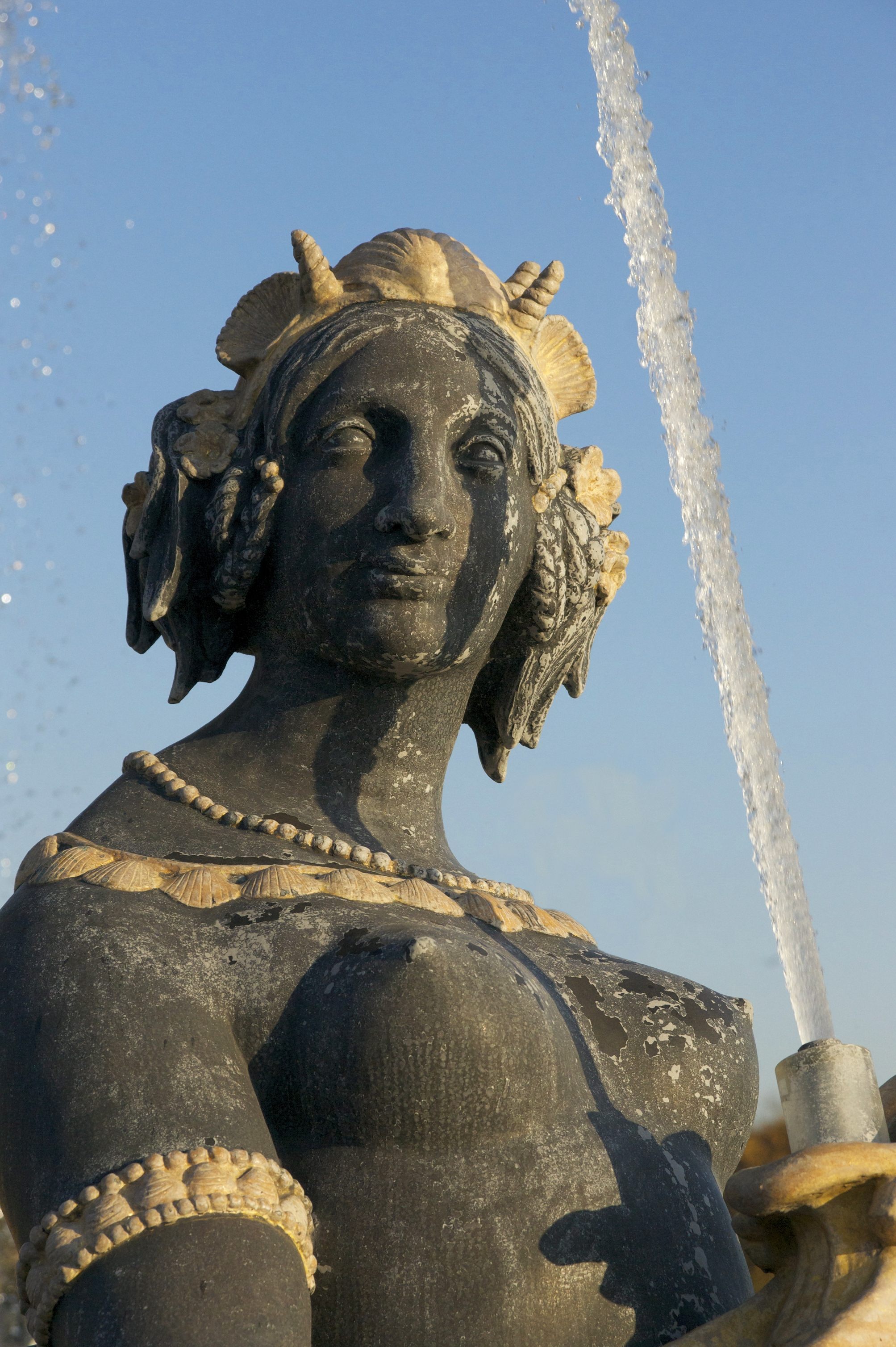
Bust of Nereid

The Maritime Fountain, to the south, closer to the River Seine, represents the maritime spirit of France. Large semi-nude figures supporting the vasque represent the Mediterranean Sea and the Atlantic Ocean. Other figures beneath the vasque represent the industries of the sea; coral, fish, shells and pearls.

The figures are seated in the prow of a ship, the symbol of the City of Paris, and they are surrounded by dolphins spraying water through their nostrils.

Above the vasque, supporting the mushroom-shaped cap, are figures representing the spirits of Maritime Navigation, Astronomy and Commerce. Next to them are swans which spout water into the basin below.

In the basin, tritons and nereids hold fish which spout water upwards to the rim of the vasque.

The Fountain of the Rivers, to the north, closer to the Madeleine church, has large figures supporting the vasque who represent the Rhône River and the Rhine River. The other major figures represent the main harvests of France; Wheat and Grapes, Flowers and Fruit.

The figures above the vasque who support the cap represent the spirits of River Navigation, Agriculture and Industry.

== Water supply and the fountain design ==
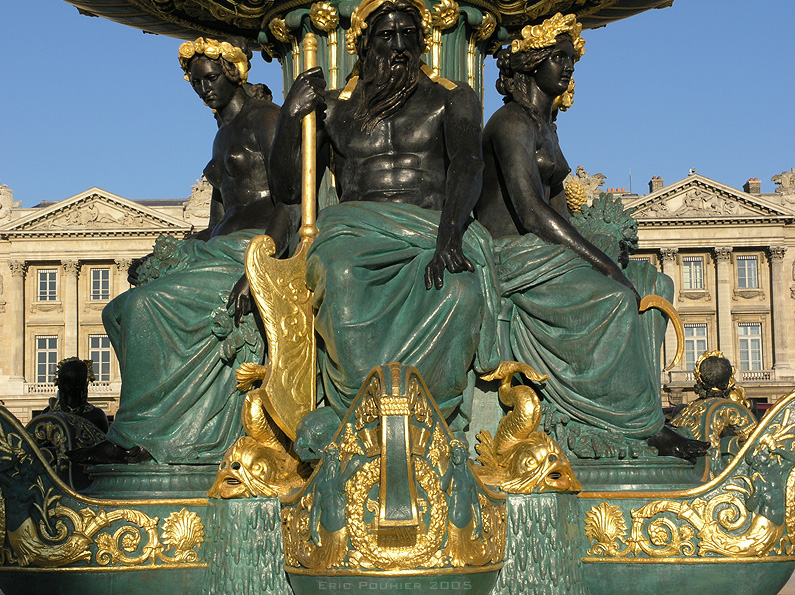
Fontaines de la Concorde (detail)

Water for the fountains was supplied by the canal de l'Ourcq, begun by Napoleon at the beginning of his reign. The original fountains had no pumps and operated by gravity- water flowed from the basin at La Villette, where the water of the canal arrived in Paris, at a higher elevation than the Place de la Concorde. The overflow water went into the Seine. Beginning in 1840, 6,000 cubic meters of water per day from La Villette were set aside for the Fontaines de la Concorde.

The fountains were carefully designed so that a sheet of water flowed evenly from the rim of the vasque, even if the wind was strong and the water supply was uneven. A small channel hidden just inside the rim of the vasque moderates the flow of water.

In the 20th century, the gravity system was replaced with pumps, which recycle the water.

== See also ==
- Fountains in Paris

== Bibliography ==
- Barozzi, Jacques (2010). Paris de Fontaine en Fontaine. Paris: Parigramme. ISBN 978-2-84096-658-6.
- Marilyn Symmes (editor), Fountains - Splash and Spectacle - Water and Design from the Renaissance to the Present. Thames and Hudson, in association with Cooper Hewitt National Design Museum, Smithsonian Institution, 1998
- Beatrice de Andia (editor), Paris et ses Fontaines, de la Renaissance a nos jours, Collection Paris et son Patrimoine, Paris, 1995
- Schneider, Donald, The Works and Doctrine of Jacques Ignace Hittorff (1792–1867), 2 vols. New York, 1977.
