= Jean-Baptiste Nicolet =

French actor (1728–1796)

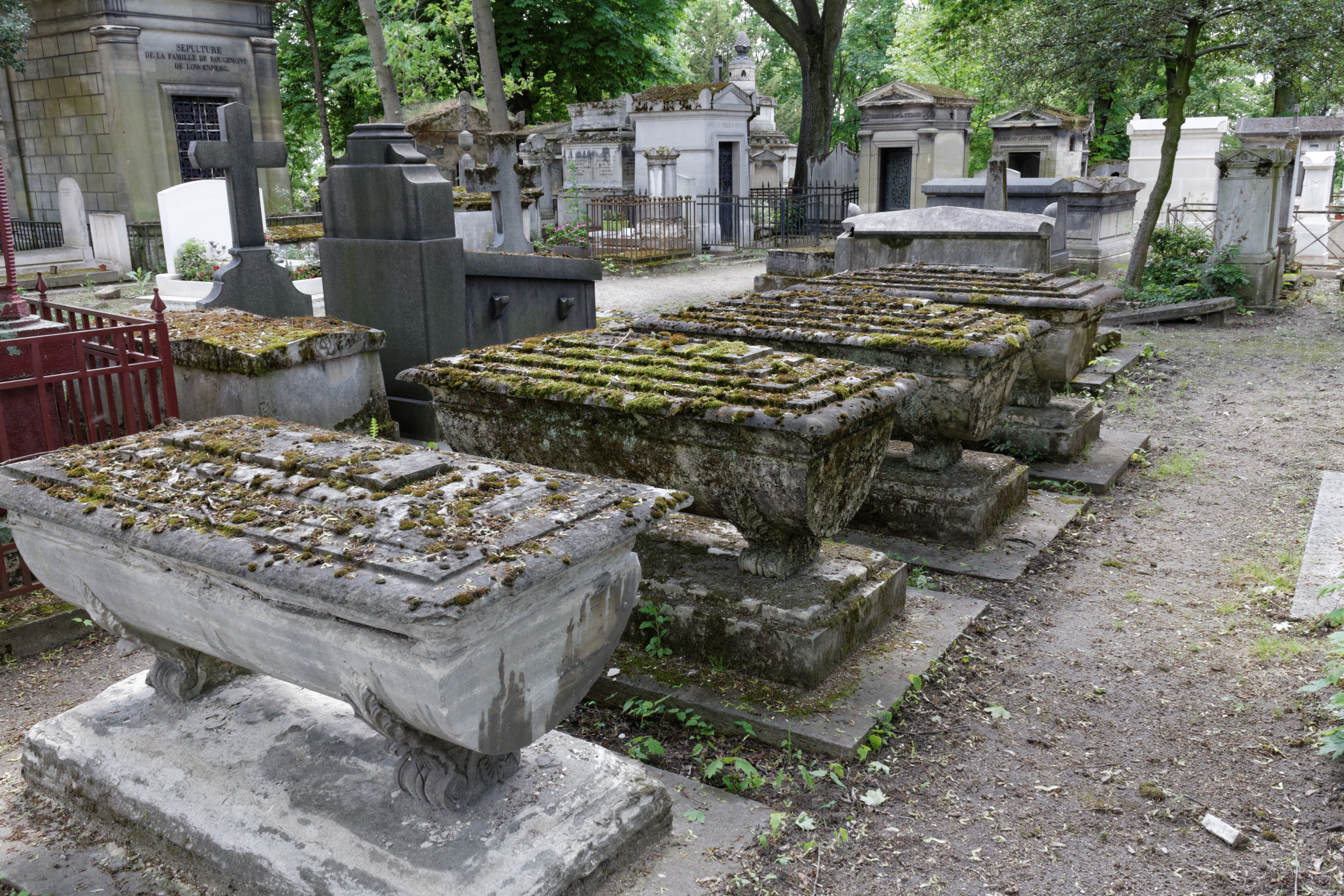
- Nicolet's grave at Père-Lachaise cemetery (41st division)
- Born: 16 April 1728; Paris
- Died: 27 December 1796 (aged 68); Paris
- Occupations: Actor, manager
- Spouse: Anne-Antoimette Desmoulins

Jean-Baptiste Nicolet (French pronunciation: [ʒɑ̃ batist nikɔlɛ]; 16 April 1728 – 27 December 1796) was an 18th-century French actor and artist manager.

He was the eldest son of puppeteer, dance master and violinist Guillaume Nicolet. He set up the theatre company Grands-Danseurs du Roi, the predecessor of the Théâtre de la Gaîté.

He married the actress and theatre director Anne Antoinette Desmoulins in 1766.
