= Théâtre de la Gaîté-Montparnasse =

Venue in Paris, France

Coordinates: 48°50′21.5″N 2°19′23″E

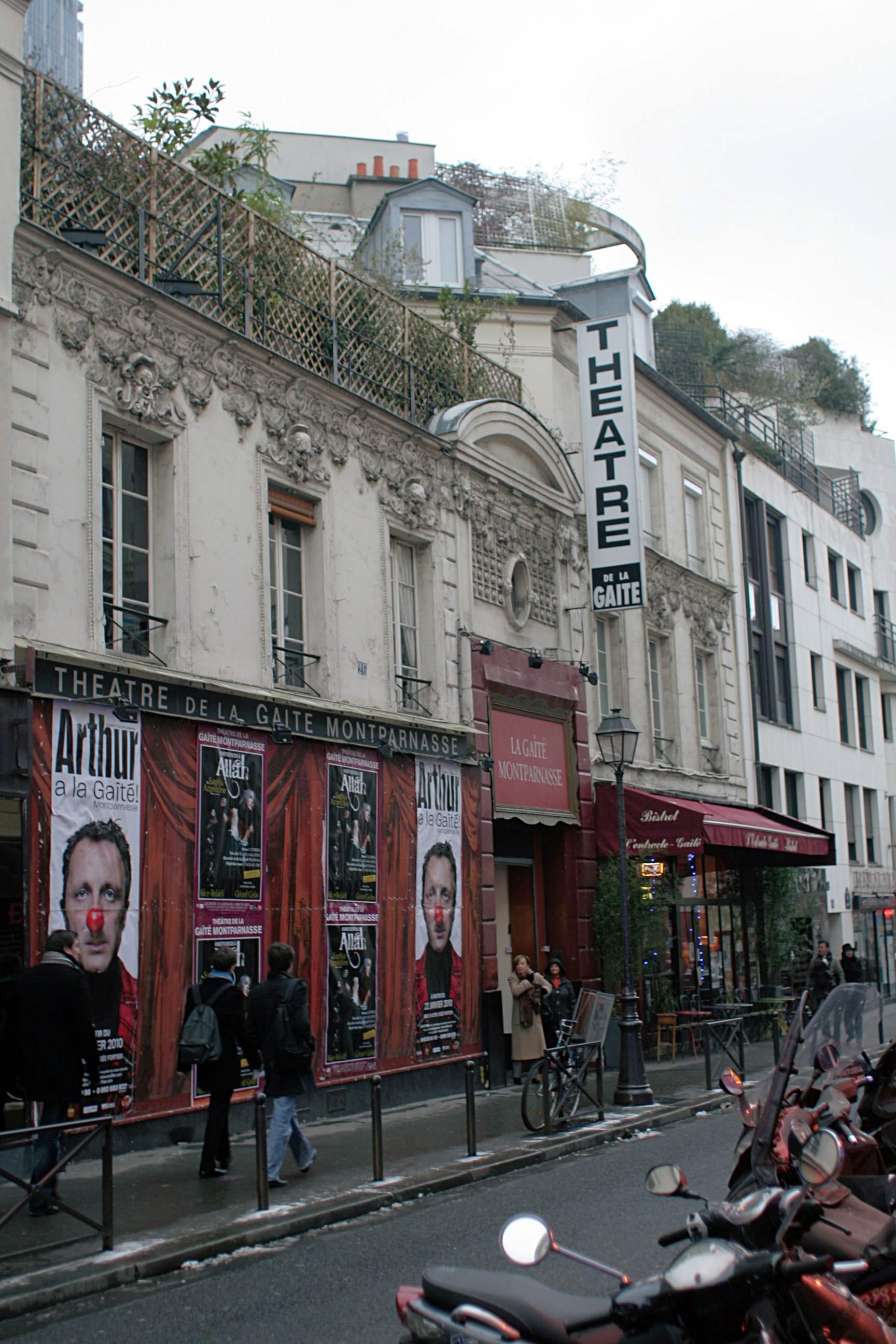
Théâtre de la Gaîté-Montparnasse.

The Théâtre de la Gaîté-Montparnasse (French pronunciation: [teɑtʁ də la ɡɛte mɔ̃paʁnas]) is a venue situated at 26, rue de la Gaîté, in the Montparnasse quarter of Paris, in the 14th arrondissement. It opened in 1868 and seats 399 people.

In addition to functioning as a popular café-concert venue for many decades, it evolved into a legitimate theatre, offering not only commercial plays but also, by the end of the nineteenth century, occasional new experimentalist plays of the Independent Theatre movement. One such effort was Paul Fort's Théâtre d'Art disappointing presentation, on 5 February 1892, of a French translation of Marlowe's The Tragical History of Doctor Faustus.

== Productions since 1946 ==
- 1946 : Victor ou les enfants au pouvoir by Roger Vitrac with Juliette Gréco.
- 1958 : Douze hommes en colère by Reginald Rose, after the scenario of the Sidney Lumet film
- 1959 : Bon week-end Monsieur Benett with Denise Grey and Henri Guisol.
- 1960 : Sugar Plum by Israël Horovitz with Laurent Terzieff.
- 1962 : Lieutenant Tenant then L'avenir est dans les Œufs by Eugène Ionesco, design by Jean-Marie Serreau.
- 1963 : La crécelle with Claude Rich and Jacqueline Gauthier.
- 1965 : Le goûter des généraux by Boris Vian.
- 1966 : Le knack by Ann Jellicoe with Bernard Fresson and Monique Tarbès.
- 1968 : La famille Tott with Michel Galabru and Colette Castel.
- 1969 : Un jour dans la mort de Joe Egg by Peter Nichols with Jean Rochefort, and Marthe Keller.
- 1970 : L'augmentation by Georges Perec
- 1971 : Le précepteur by R.Lenz
- 1972 : Un pape à New-York with Jean-Pierre Marielle and Nelly Borgeaud.
- 1973 : Butley with Bernard Fresson and Gérard Lartigau.
- 1974 : Pol by Alain Didier Weill.
- 1977 : Elles, Steffy, Pomme, Jeanne and Vivi with Anémone, Dominique Labourier and Viviane Elbaz.
- From 1978, double shows of 20 hours and 22 hours were instituted, in which variétés and theatre alternated. These include :
  - Font and Val
  - Le Golden Gate-Quartet
  - Lény Escudéro
  - Jean-Roger Caussimon (1980),
  - Luis Rego
  - Le père Noël est une ordure, by the troupe du Splendid, with Gérard Jugnot, Christian Clavier, Thierry Lhermitte, Anémone, Marie-Anne Chazel, Bernard Moineau.
  - L'os de cœur with Francis Huster
  - Elle voit des nains partout with Claire Nadeau
  - Le jour le plus con by Philippe Bruneau.
- 1982 : Vive les femmes by Jean-Marc Reiser, design by Claude Confortès, with Maurice Risch, Pauline Lafont and Roland Giraud.
- 1983 : Chienne Dactylographe by G.Roignant, design by D. Benoin with J. Dacqmine, and Hélène Duc
- 1983 : Des jours and des nuits by Harold Pinter, design by F.Marthourand with Bernard Murat.
- 1983 : La fausse libertine after Crébillon fils, design by Jacques Bachelier.
- 1983 : Comment devenir une mère juive en dix leçons by Paul Fucks, design by Tootie Masson, with Marthe Villalonga and André Valardy.
- 1984 : Chacun pour moi by C.A Augereau, design by Daniel Colas with Yves Rénier.
- 1984 : Grand-père by Rémo Forlani, design by Michel Fagadau with Victor Lanoux then Jean-Pierre Darras, and Nadine Alari.
- 1985 : Love by Murray Schisgal, with André Dussolier, Patrick Chesnais and Catherine Rich.
- 1986 : La gagne by Michel Fermaud.
- 1987 : reprise of Bonsoir Maman by Marsha Norman, design by Lars Schmidt with Françoise Christophe and Catherine Rich
- 1987 : L'éloignement de Loleh Bellon with Pierre Arditi and Macha Méril.
- 1988 : Reprise of A Day in the Death of Joe Egg in an adaptation by Claude Roy, with Patrick Chesnais and Sabine Haudepin.
- 1988 : Nocturnes after Stefan Zweig with Jacques Weber.
- 1989 : Frédéric Chopin with Eric Berchot at the piano and Philippe Ettesse
- 1989 : Faut pas tuer maman de Charlotte Keatley, adaptation by Marcel Bluwal and Michel Fagadau, design by Michel Fagadau, with Danièle Lebrun, Catherine Frot, Viviane Elbaz and Anouk Grinberg.
- 1990 : Un œil plus bleu que l'autre by Évelyne Grandjean with Jean-Pierre Cassel, and Dominique Labourier.
- 1990 (September) : Coiffures pour dames by Robert Harling, adapté par Claire Nadeau and Michèle Laroque, design by Stéphane Hillel with Marthe Villalonga, Françoise Christophe, Geneviève Fontanel, Claire Maurier, Michèle Laroque and Annie Grégorio.
- 1991 (June) : reprise of Callas by Elizabeth Marocco, mise en scène de Dominique Lardenois.
- 1991 (October) : reprise of Voltaire and Rousseau by Jean-François Prévand with Jean-Paul Farré and Jean-Luc Moreau.
- 1992 (January) : Passagères by Daniel Besnehard, design by André Voustinas with Michèle Simonnet, Valérie Kaprisky, Philippe Delplanche.
- 1992 (April) : Nina by André Roussin, design by Bernard Murat with Jean Barney, Darry Cowl, Adriana Asti.
- 1992 (October) : Confidences pour clarinette by Michel Christofer, mise en scène de Jean-Luc Moreau with Pierre-François Roussillon, Paule Noelle, François Pacôme, Jean-Luc Moreau, François Perrot.
- 1992 (December) : La contrebasse by Patrick Süskind, design by Philippe Ferran, collaboration artistique de Jean Poiret, with Jacques Villeret.
- 1993 (March) : Ce qui arrive and ce qu'on attend by Jean-Marie Besset, design by Patrice Kerbrat, with Christophe Malavoy, Marie-France Pisier, Sabine Haudepin, Claire Nadeau.
- 1994 (January) : Tempête sur le pays d'Egypte by Pierre Laville with Brigitte Fossey and Manuel Blanc.
- 1994 (March) : Oleanna by David Mamand with Charlotte Gainsbourg (her stage debut) and Maurice Benichou.
- 1994 : Singing tour by Régine.
- 1995 : La musica deuxième with Fanny Ardant and Niels Arestrup.
- 1996 : "Robin des Bois d'à peu près Alexandre Dumas" by Pierre-François Martin-Laval and Marina Foïs with Les Robins des Bois and Isabelle Nanty.
- 2002 : Cravate club by Fabrice Roger-Lacan, design by Isabelle Nanty with Charles Berling, Edouard Baer

== See also ==
- Théâtre de la Gaîté (disambiguation)
