= Jean-François-Joseph Lecointe =

French architect (1783–1858)

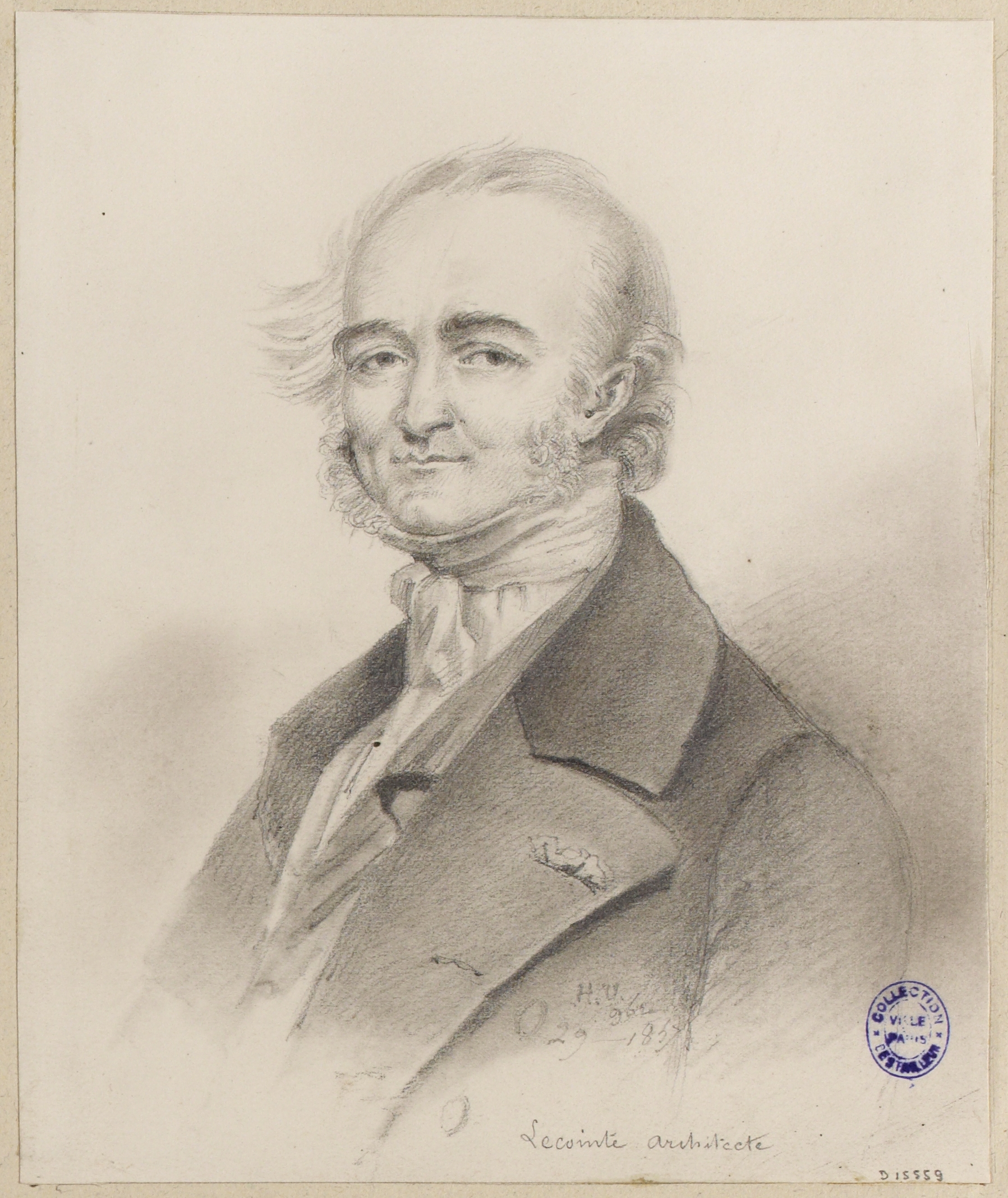
Jean-François-Joseph Lecointe

Jean-François-Joseph Lecointe (1783–1858) was official architect to king Charles X of France. He worked in direct collaboration with Jacques Ignace Hittorff from 1819 to 1830, in particular on the Théâtre de l'Ambigu-Comique and the organisation of grand royal ceremonies and the elaborate temporary structures these required. He is buried at the Notre-Dame cemetery in Versailles.

== Sources ==
- http://p.landru.free.fr/chapdelaine/article.php3?id_article=387%5B‍%5D
