= Alphonse Cusin =

French architect

Alphonse Adolphe Cusin (6 May 1820 in Melun – 26 December 1894 in the 13th arrondissement of Paris) was a French architect, a student of Alfred de Dreux.

== Selected works ==
- 1861: Théâtre de la Gaîté Lyrique
- 1869: Théâtre des Gobelins
