= Jacques Ignace Hittorff =

French architect (1792–1867)

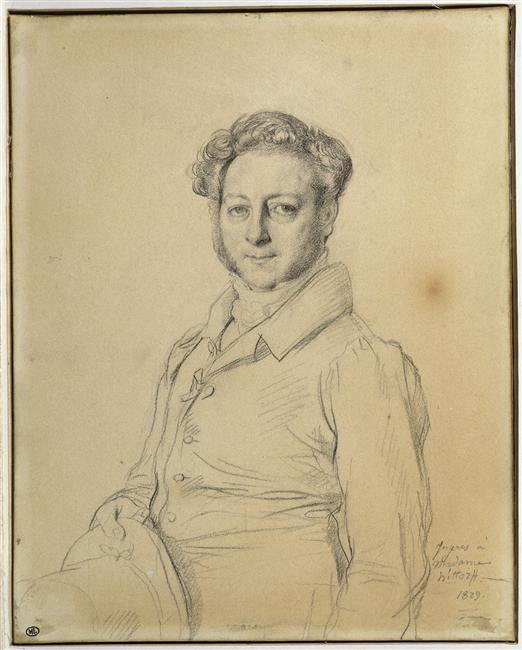
Jacques Hittorff; portrait by Ingres.

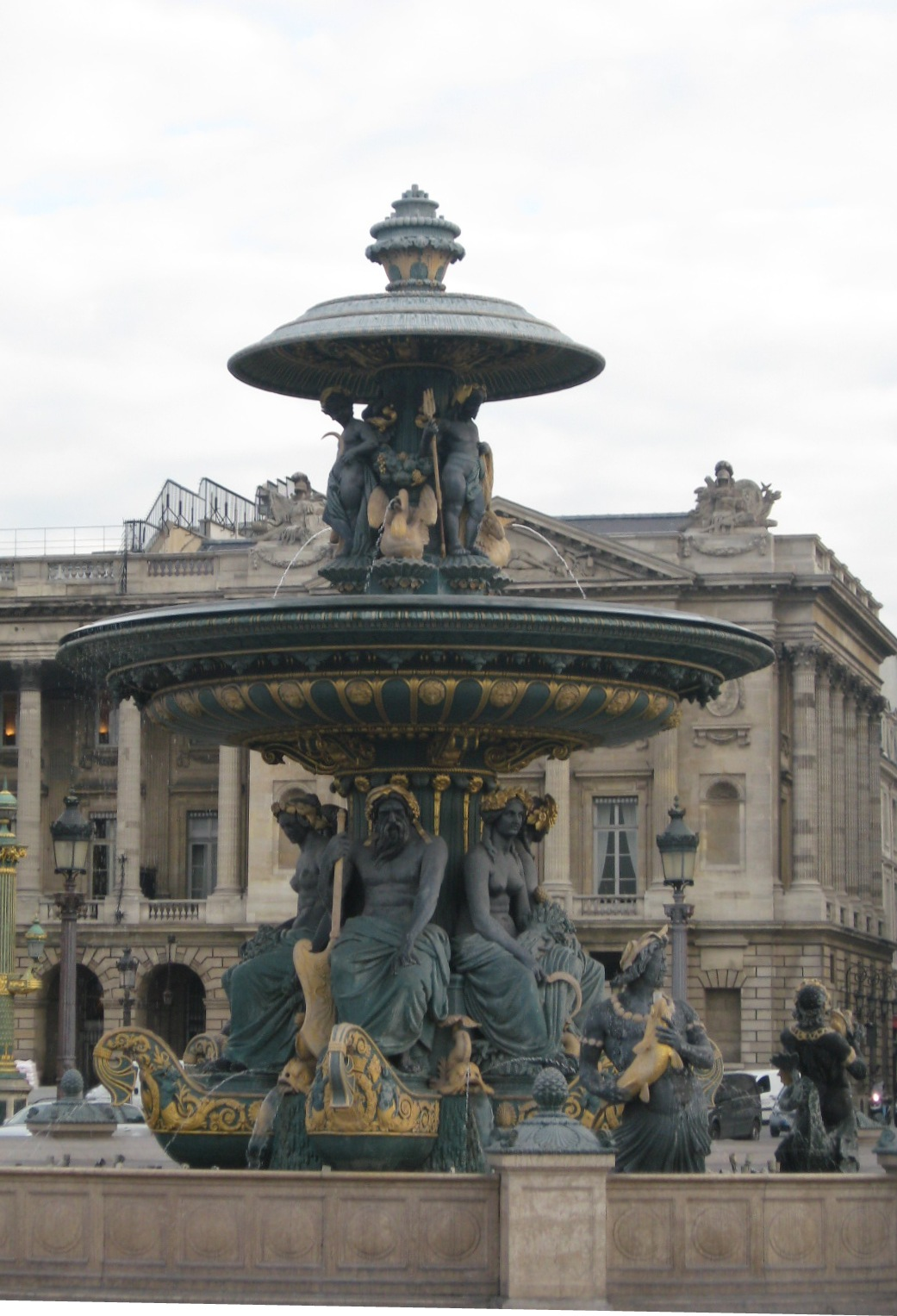
Fontaines de la Concorde (1836) in the Place de la Concorde

Jacques Ignace Hittorff or, in German, Jakob Ignaz Hittorff (German: [ˈjaːkop ˈɪɡnaːts ˈhɪtɔʁf], French: [ʒak iɲas itɔʁf]) (Cologne, 20 August 1792 – 25 March 1867) was a German-born French architect who combined advanced structural use of new materials, notably cast iron, with conservative Beaux-Arts classicism in a career that spanned the decades from the Restoration to the Second Empire.

== Biography ==
After serving an apprenticeship to a mason in his native city, he went in 1810 to Paris, and studied for some years at the Académie des Beaux-Arts while working concurrently as a draughtsman for Charles Percier. At the Académie, he was a favourite pupil of the government architect François-Joseph Bélanger, who employed him in the construction of one of the first cast-iron constructions in France, the cast-iron and glass dome of the grain market, Halle au Blé (1808–13). In 1814, Bélanger appointed Hittorff his principal inspector on construction sites. Succeeding Bélanger as government architect in 1818, Hittorff designed many important public and private buildings in Paris and also in the south of France. From 1819 to 1830, in collaboration with Jean-François-Joseph Lecointe he directed the royal fêtes and ceremonials, for which elaborate temporary structures were required, a post with a long history, which the two architects inherited from Bélanger. Hittorff also designed a new building for the Théâtre de l'Ambigu-Comique with Lecointe.

After making architectural tours in Germany, England, Italy and Sicily, Hittorff published the result of his Sicilian observations in Architecture antique de la Sicile (3 volumes, 1826–1830; revised, 1866–1867), and also in Architecture moderne de la Sicile (1826–1835).

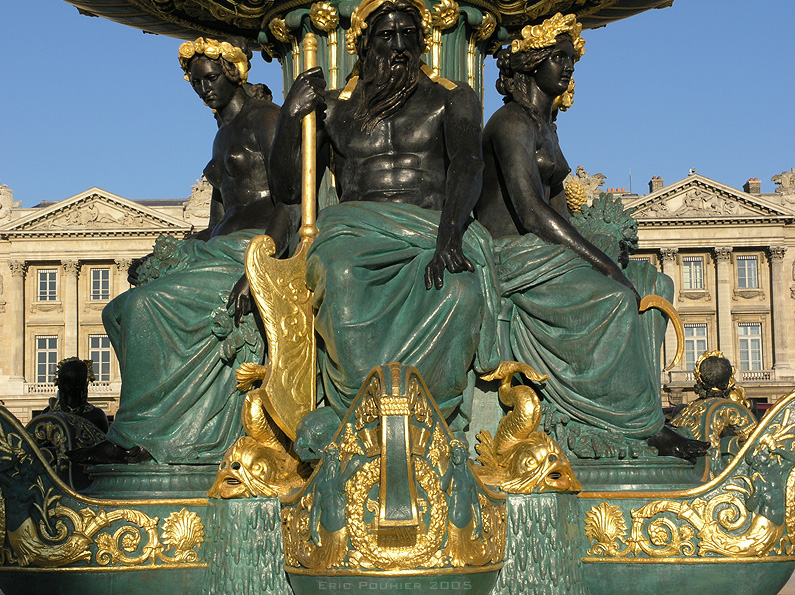
Detail of Fontaines de la Concorde

One of his important discoveries was that colour had been employed in ancient Greek architecture, a subject which he especially discussed in Architecture polychrome chez les Grecs (1830) and in Restitution du temple d'Empédocle à Sélinonte (1851). In accordance with the doctrines enunciated in these works, he was in the habit of making colour an important feature in most of his architectural designs.

In 1833, Hittorff was entrusted with redesigning the Place de la Concorde, carried out in stages between 1833 and 1846. In 1836 the obelisk of Luxor was erected and the two Fontaines de la Concorde, one commemorating river navigation and commerce and the other ocean navigation and commerce, were placed on either side. At each angle of the square's extended octagon a statue was erected representing a French city: Bordeaux, Brest, Lille, Lyon, Marseille, Nantes, Rouen and Strasbourg. In 1833 he was also elected a member of the Académie des Beaux-Arts.

With Thomas Leverton Donaldson and Charles Robert Cockerell, Hittorff was also a member of the committee formed in 1836 to determine whether the Elgin Marbles and other Greek statuary in the British Museum had originally been coloured; their conclusions were published in Transactions of the Royal Institute of British Architects, 1842.

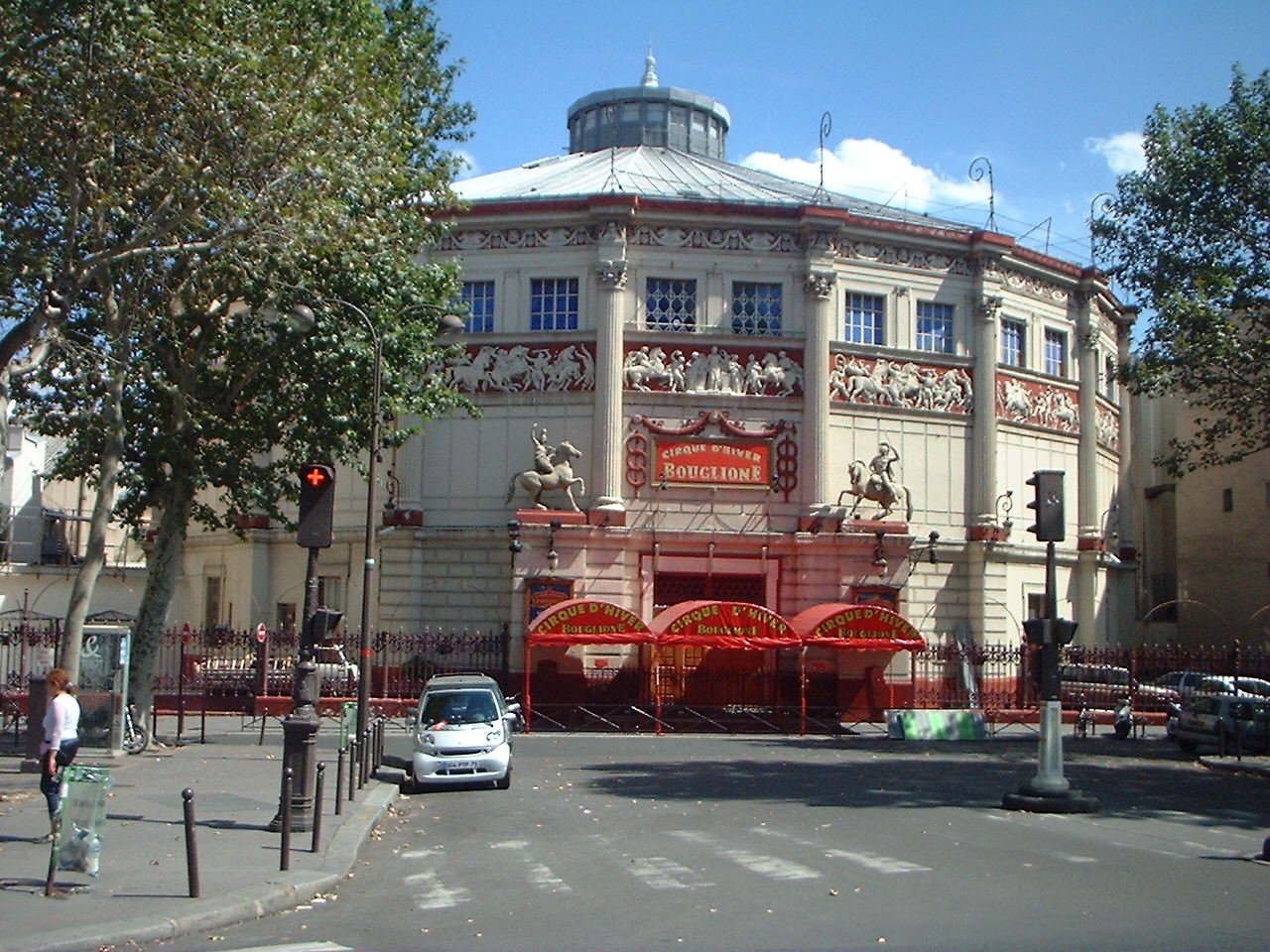
Cirque d'hiver in Paris

=== Principal works ===
Hittorff's principal buildings are the church of St. Vincent de Paul in the basilica style, which was constructed in partnership with Jean-Baptiste Lepère, 1830–44, and the Cirque d'hiver, also in Paris, which opened as the Cirque Napoléon in 1852. Its 20-sided polygon around an oval central ring or stage surrounded by steeply tiered seating, is covered by a polygonal roof with no central post that could block the view.

Hittorff also designed the Circus of the Empress, the Rotunda of the panoramas, the Gare du Nord (1861–63), many cafés and restaurants on the Champs-Élysées, the facades forming the circle round the Arc de Triomphe in Place de l'Étoile, as well as many embellishments in the Bois de Boulogne and other places.

A project that failed to please Napoleon III was Hittorff's proposal for the Palais de l'Industrie to be constructed in 1853 to house the Exposition Universelle of 1855. On 27 March 1852, the Prince-Président— soon to declare himself Emperor— decreed that this exhibition would take place in a hall to rival the Crystal Palace of the 1851 Great Exhibition in London. Hittorff's solution, an immense hall of iron and glass, was too audacious. The commission passed to other architects, and a conservative compromise was effected.

Hittorff was part of the team that designed the Grand Hôtel du Louvre in Paris, which opened in 1855 in time for the Exposition Universelle. He worked on this project with Alfred Armand (1805–88), Auguste Pellechet (1829-1903) and Charles Rohault de Fleury (1801–75).

== See also ==
- List of works by Eugène Guillaume
