= Dance on the Volcano =

1938 film directed by Hans Steinhoff

- Directed by: Hans Steinhoff
- Written by: Hans Rehberg; Hans Steinhoff; Peter Hagen
- Produced by: Werner Kortwich
- Starring: Gustaf Gründgens; Sybille Schmitz; Ralph Arthur Roberts
- Cinematography: Ewald Daub
- Edited by: Martha Dübber
- Music by: Theo Mackeben
- Production company: Majestic Film
- Distributed by: Tobis Film
- Release date: 30 November 1938
- Running time: 86 minutes
- Country: Germany
- Language: German

Dance on the Volcano (German: Tanz auf dem Vulkan) is a 1938 German historical musical comedy film directed by Hans Steinhoff and starring Gustaf Gründgens, Sybille Schmitz and Ralph Arthur Roberts. It was shot at the Johannisthal Studios in Berlin. The film's sets were designed by the art director Rochus Gliese. A light-hearted costume film, the production was a significant departure for both its director, best known for his Nazi-supporting propaganda films, and its star Gründgens, celebrated as a classical actor.

It made significant changes to the historical story, including turning Jean-Gaspard Deburau from a mime into a singer. Gründgens was unhappy with his performance, while both Adolf Hitler and the Minister of Propaganda Joseph Goebbels were critical of the production. This led to some sources mistakenly suggesting it was either banned or had its release delayed for several years. In fact, the film was given an immediatate release and appears to have been popular with contemporary audiences.

== Synopsis ==
In Paris in 1830, the popular singer Jean-Gaspard Deburau performs in front of large crowds at the Théâtre des Funambules every evening. In the day he secretly writes satirical ballads against the reactionary reign of Charles X. When both men compete for the romantic affections of Countess Cambouilly, Debureau begins to openly sing his attacks on the monarch. He is sentenced to death, but is rescued on the steps of the guillotine when the people of Paris rise up and overthrow the King, driving him from the country and placing his cousin Louis Phillipe on the throne.

== Cast ==
- Gustaf Gründgens as Komödiant Debureau
- Sybille Schmitz as Gräfin Heloise Cambouilly
- Ralph Arthur Roberts as König Karl X.
- Theo Lingen as Graf Cambouilly
- Gisela Uhlen as Schauspielerin Angèle Destouches
- Hilde Hildebrand as Gräfin X
- Hans Leibelt as Prinz Louis Philippe
- Will Dohm as Theaterdirektor Pomponille
- Gretl Theimer as Schirmverkäuferin
- Paul Bildt as Mönch
- Walter Werner as Debureaus Freund Maurac
- Daisy Spies as Bühnentänzerin
- Franz Nicklisch as Debureaus Freund Larbaud
- Erich Ziegel as Fürst Sulluc
- Elsa Wagner as Pauline Pomponille
- Wolf Trutz as Schauspieler Renard
- Franz Weber as Gardobier Gaston
- Fred Becker as Solotänzer
- Eduard Bornträger as Königsfreundlicher Pariser Bürger
- Egon Brosig as Flugblattlesender Pariser Bürger
- Curt Cappi as Theaterportier
- Ernst Dernburg as Baron am Königshof
- Jac Diehl as Soldat
- Robert Dorsay as Theaterintendant
- Erich Dunskus as Gefängniswärter
- Max Ernst as Theaterarbeiter / Pariser Bürger
- Doris Krüger as Tochter des Gastwirts
- Fred Köster as Lakai bei Graf Cambouilly
- Ernst Legal as Dr. Thibaud
- Karl Meixner as Aufwiegler
- Luise Morland as Theaterbesucherin
- Hadrian Maria Netto as Polizeipräfekt Gravon
- Karl Platen as Prinz Louis Philippes Diener Theodor
- Ernst Albert Schaach as Lakai beim Ball
- Hans Schneeberger as Adjutant des Königs
- S.O. Schoening as Theaterbesucher
- Werner Schott as Soldat
- Heinrich Schroth as Prinz Louis Philippes Vertrauter
- Willi Schur as Plakatkleber
- Werner Segtrop as Hausmeister Georgieff
- Werner Stock as Theaterangestellter
- Heinz Wemper as Henkersknecht
- Max Wilmsen as Theaterbesucher
- Bruno Ziener as Logenschließer

== Bibliography ==
- Klaus, Ulrich J. Deutsche Tonfilme: Jahrgang 1938. Klaus-Archiv, 1988.
- Niven, Bill, Hitler and Film: The Führer's Hidden Passion. Yale University Press, 2018.
- O'Brien, Mary-Elizabeth. Nazi Cinema as Enchantment: The Politics of Entertainment in the Third Reich. Camden House, 2006.
- Rentschler, Eric. The Ministry of Illusion: Nazi Cinema and Its Afterlife. Harvard University Press, 1996.
