= Théâtre des Funambules =

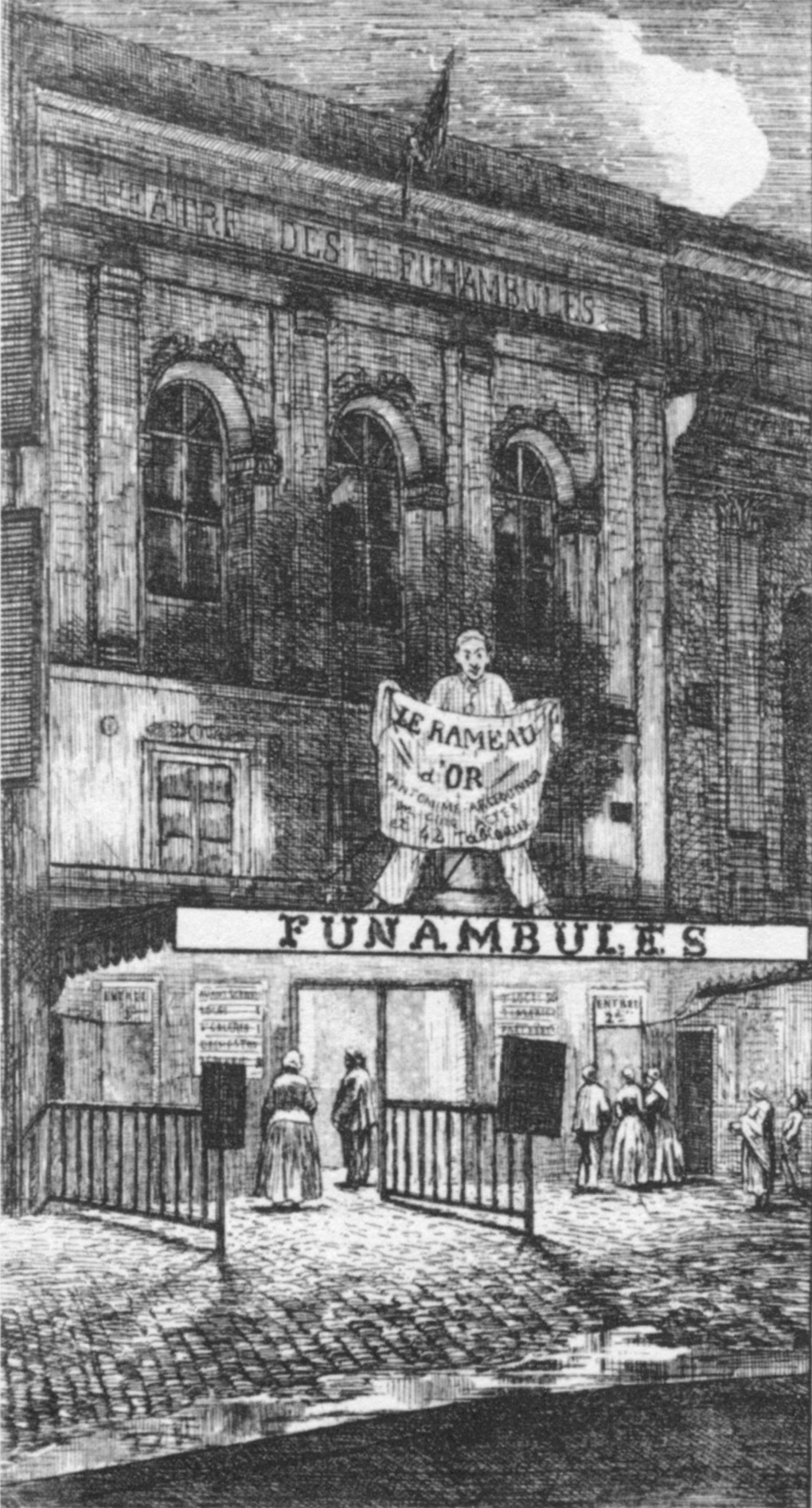
Théâtre des Funambules (c. 1862)

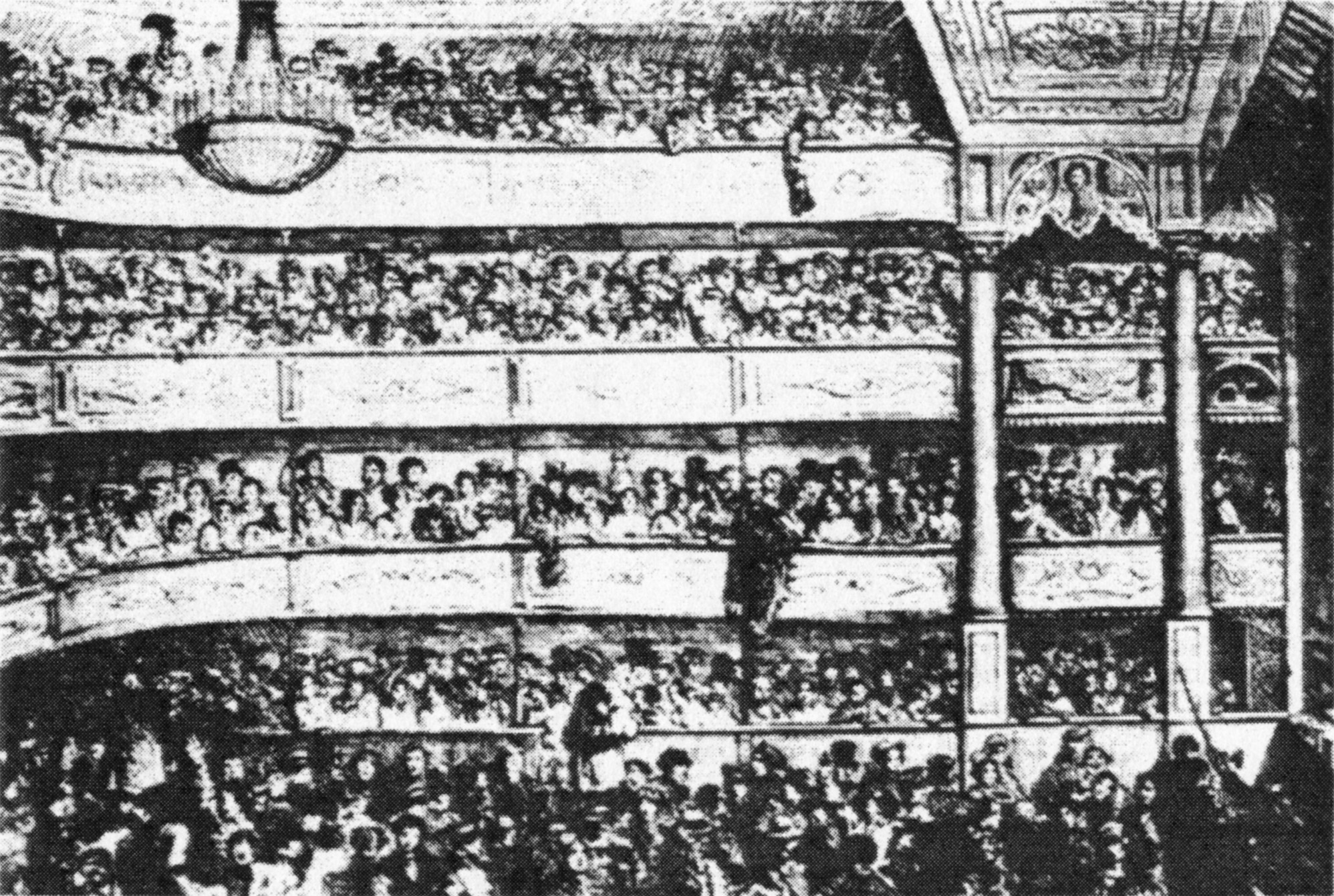
The auditorium of the theatre before a performance

The Théâtre des Funambules (French pronunciation: [teɑtʁ de fynɑ̃byl]; 'Theatre of the Tightrope-Walkers') was a theater located on the boulevard du Temple in Paris, sometimes called the Boulevard du Crime. It was located between the prominent Théâtre de la Gaîté, and the much smaller Théâtre des Délassements-Comiques.

Originally an informal venue for acrobatics and pantomime, a theatre was eventually built in 1816 with a seating capacity of 500 that was later enlarged to accommodate 773. The Funambules became celebrated for the performances of the 'Pierrot' mime Jean-Gaspard Deburau, between around 1819 and 1846, and also the early career of the great classical actor Frédérick Lemaître.

The theatre was demolished in 1862, along with other neighboring venues such as Théâtre de la Gaîté, during Haussmann's renovation of Paris.

== Popular culture ==
The 1938 German film Dance on the Volcano featured Gustaf Gründgens as Jean-Gaspard Deburau. Marcel Carné set his 1945 French film Les Enfants du Paradis in the Théâtre des Funambules to evoke the atmosphere of the July Monarchy (1830–48), including the figures of Deburau and Lemaître among the main roles.
