= Dilemma of Two Angels =

1948 film directed by Maurice Tourneur

- Directed by: Maurice Tourneur
- Written by: Jean-Paul Le Chanois
- Produced by: Eugène Tucherer
- Starring: Paul Meurisse; Simone Signoret; Marcel Herrand
- Cinematography: Claude Renoir
- Edited by: Christian Gaudin
- Music by: Yves Baudrier
- Production company: B.U.P. Française
- Distributed by: La Société des Films Sirius
- Release date: 3 October 1948
- Running time: 85 minutes
- Country: France
- Language: French

Dilemma of Two Angels (French: Impasse des Deux Anges) is a 1948 French crime film directed by Maurice Tourneur and starring Paul Meurisse, Simone Signoret and Marcel Herrand. It was the final film directed by Tourneur in a career that stretched back to the silent era and included nearly a hundred films.

The film's sets were designed by the art director Jean d'Eaubonne.

== Cast ==
- Paul Meurisse as Jean
- Simone Signoret as Anne-Marie / Marianne
- Marcel Herrand as Marquis Antoine de Fontaines
- Paul Demange as Minus
- Jacques Castelot as Le Vicomte
- Marcelle Praince as La Suchesse
- Danièle Delorme as Anne-Marie
- François Patrice as Petit Gars
- Sinoël as Sylvain, le coiffeur
- Paul Amiot as Le chef
- André Nicard
- Jean Aymé as Un invité
- Charlotte Ecard as Céline
- Gustave Gallet as Le notaire
- Jacqueline Marbaux as Catherine
- Reggie Nalder as Bébé
- Lucas Gridoux as L'impresario de Marianne
- Jacques Baumer as Jérôme, le maître d'hôtel
- Arlette Accart
- Fernand Blot as Le garçon
- Maurice Cartier
- Jacqueline Fontaine as Petit rôle
- René Hell as Le badaud à la bicyclette
- Julien Lacroix
- Yolande Laffon as Sophie
- Simone Max as Petit rôle
- Moriss
- Henri Niel as Le chanoine
- Roger Vincent as Petit rôle
- Charles Vissières as Le vieux cabot

== Bibliography ==
- Waldman, Harry. Maurice Tourneur: The Life and Films. McFarland, 2001.
