= Jean-Gaspard Deburau =

Czech-French mime

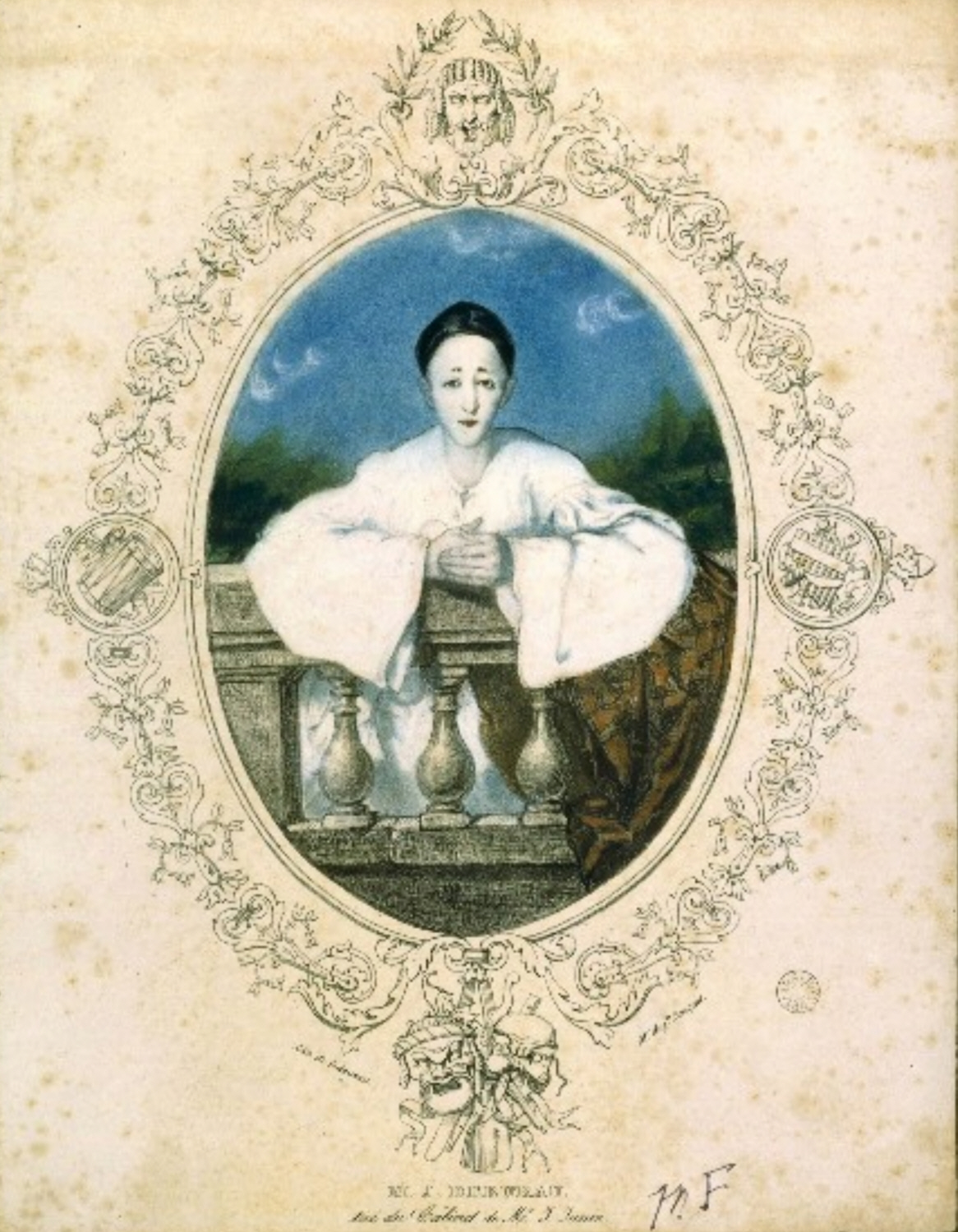
Auguste Bouquet: portrait of Jean-Gaspard Deburau (1830)

Jean-Gaspard Deburau (French pronunciation: [ʒɑ̃ ɡaspaʁ dəbyʁo]; born Jan Kašpar Dvořák; 31 July 1796 – 17 June 1846), sometimes erroneously called Debureau, was a Czech-French mime. He performed from 1816 to the year of his death at the Théâtre des Funambules, which was immortalized in Marcel Carné's poetic-realist film Children of Paradise (1945); Deburau appears in the film (under his stage-name, "Baptiste") as a major character. His most famous pantomimic creation was Pierrot—a character that served as the godfather of all the Pierrots of Romantic, Decadent, Symbolist, and early Modernist theater and art.

== Life and career ==
Born in Kolín, Bohemia (now Czech Republic), Deburau was the son of a Czech servant, Kateřina Králová (or Catherine Graff), and a former French soldier, Philippe-Germain Deburau, a native of Amiens. Jean-Gaspard became an actor and performed at the head of a nomadic troupe. In 1814 he took the company to Paris and they were hired in 1816 by the manager of the Théâtre des Funambules. The Funambules was a "minor" theater that didn't have the license to present plays with dialogue; consequently, to circumvent this restriction, it specialized in pantomimes.

Cast-lists indicate that he appeared as Pierrot right away, although it was not until 1825 that he became the sole actor to claim the role. He attained a certain fame in 1828, when the influential writer Charles Nodier published a panegyric about him. The journalist Jules Janin published a book of effusive praise, entitled Deburau, histoire du Théâtre à Quatre Sous, in 1832. By the middle of the 1830s, Deburau was widely known. Théophile Gautier wrote of his talent with enthusiasm ("the most perfect actor who ever lived"); Théodore de Banville dedicated poems and sketches to his Pierrot; Charles Baudelaire praised his style of acting.

In 1832, when he took his pantomime to the Palais-Royal, he failed spectacularly. The occasion was a benefit performance of a pantomime performed earlier—with great success—at the Funambules. Louis Péricaud, the chronicler of the Funambules, wrote that "never was there a greater disaster, a rout more complete for Deburau and his fellow-artists". Deburau himself was hissed, and he vowed to play thereafter before no other public than those "naïfs and enthusiasts" who were habitués of the Boulevard du Crime.

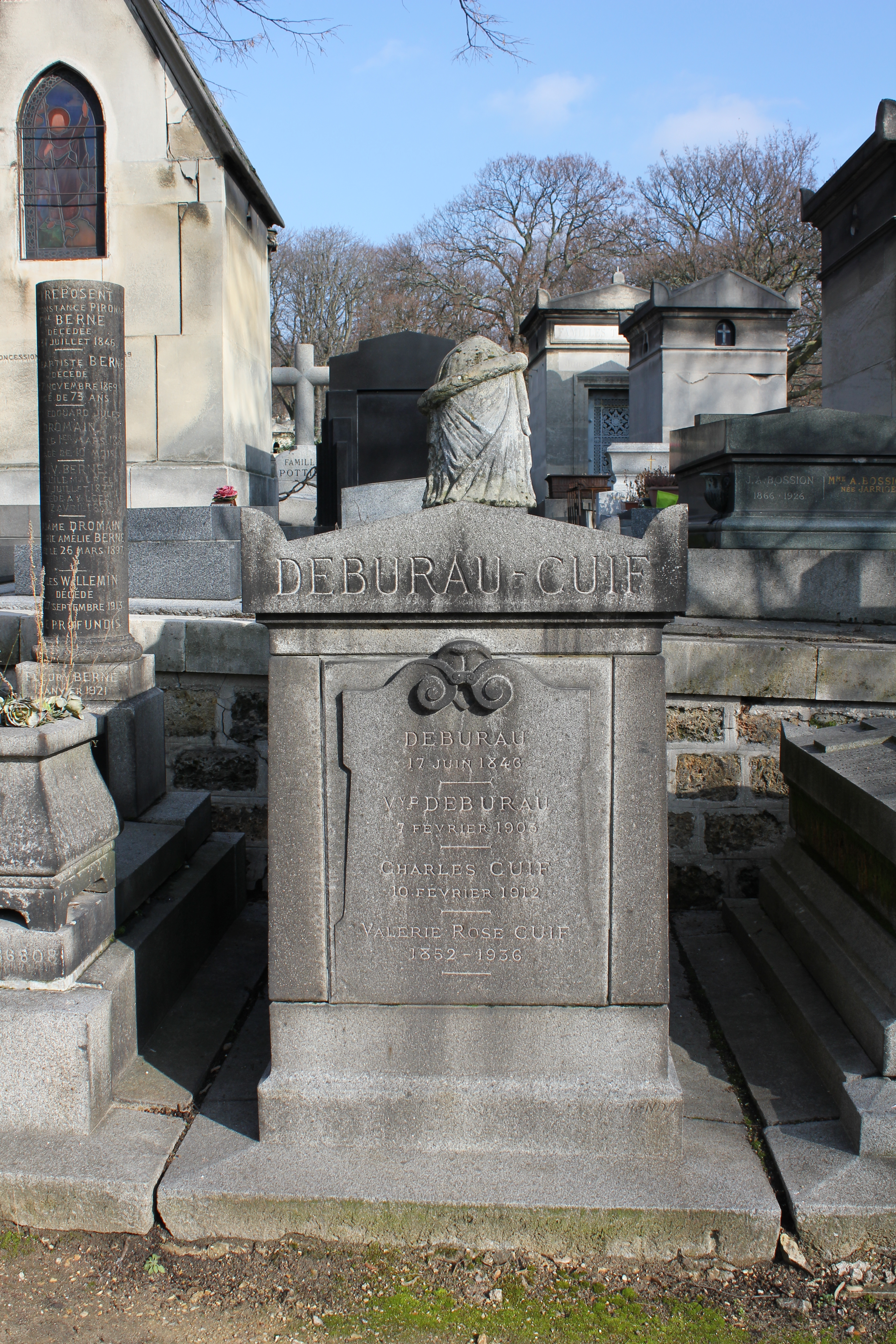
Tomb of J.-G. Deburau in Père Lachaise Cemetery, Paris

In 1836, Deburau was charged (and acquitted) with murder after killing a boy who called him "Pierrot" on the street.

When he died, his son Jean-Charles (1829–1873) took over and later founded a "school" of pantomime, which flourished first in the south of France and then, at the end of the century, in Paris.

Jean-Gaspard Deburau is buried in the Père Lachaise Cemetery in Paris (see photo at right).

== Pantomime ==
=== Character roles ===
Pierrot was not Baptiste's only creation. As Robert Storey has pointed out, Deburau performed in many pantomimes unconnected with the commedia dell'arte:

He was probably the student-sailor Blanchot in Jack, l'orang-outang (1836), for example, and the farmhand Cruchon in Le Tonnelier et le somnambule ([The Cooper and the Sleepwalker] late 1838 or early 1839), and the goatherd Mazarillo in Fra-Diavolo, ou les Brigands de la Calabre ([Brother Devil, or The Brigands of Calabria] 1844). He was certainly the Jocrisse-like comique of Hurluberlu (1842) and the engagingly naïve recruit Pichonnot of Les Jolis Soldats ([The Handsome Soldiers] 1843).

Like Chaplin's various incarnations, all of whom bear some resemblance to the Tramp, these characters, though singular and independent creations, must undoubtedly have struck their audiences as Pierrot-like. For Deburau and Pierrot were synonymous in the Paris of post-Revolutionary France.

=== Pierrot ===
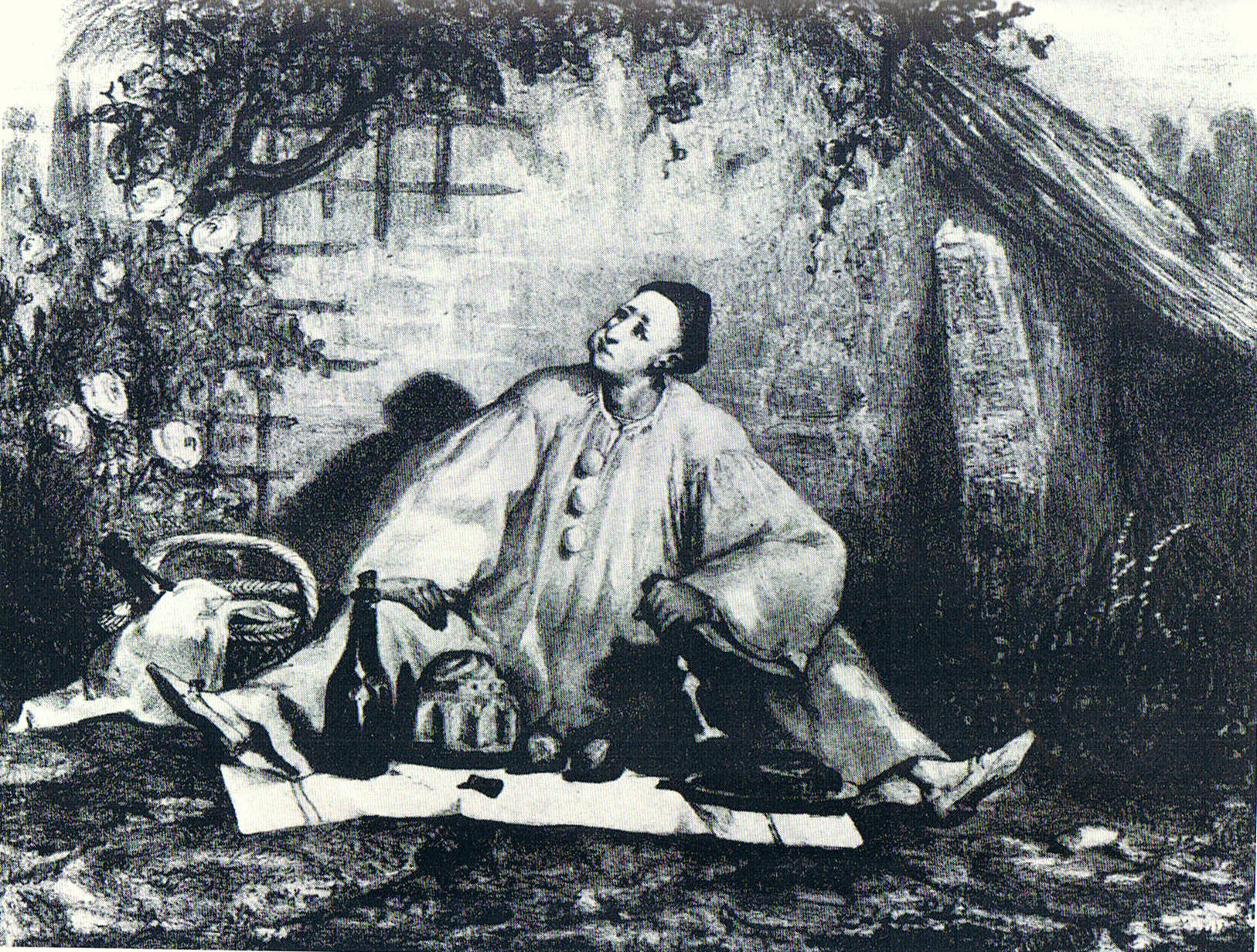
Auguste Bouquet: Pierrot's Repast: Deburau as Pierrot Gormand, c. 1830

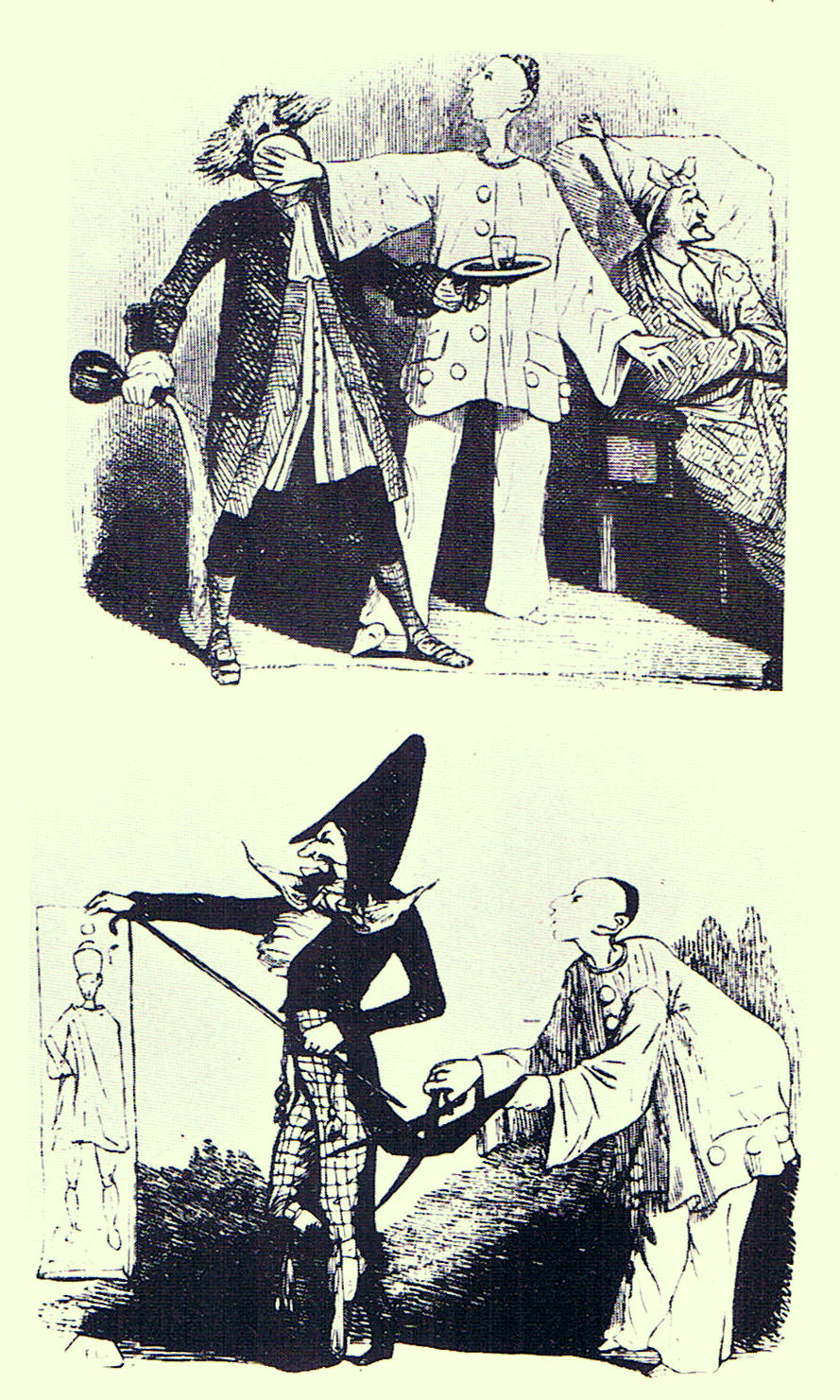
Eustache Lorsay: two Caricatures of Deburau in Satan, or The Infernal Pact, c. 1842, from Le Musée Philipon, album de tout le monde, c. 1842

Deburau's Pierrot was more aggressive in his acrobatics (his "superabundance", in Péricaud's words, "of gestures, of leaps") than Baptiste's "placid" creation, and much less aggressive in his audacity and daring. Deburau dispensed with Pierrot's coarseness and emphasized his cleverness. As theater historian Edward Nye writes, "Pierrot had somehow intellectually matured and learnt to moderate his worst excesses, or even to turn them into relative virtues." The poet Gautier reproached him for having "denaturalized" the character. Part of this may have been due to what Rémy calls the vindictiveness of Deburau's own personality; Deburau forged a role with a commanding stage presence.

The expressivity of his acting was abetted by his alterations in Pierrot's costume. His overlarge cotton blouse and trousers freed him from the constraints of the woolen dress of his predecessors, and his abandoning the frilled collar and hat gave prominence to his expressive face. A black skullcap, framing that face, was his only stark adornment.

But his real innovations came in the pantomime itself. His biographers, as well as the chroniclers of the Funambules, contend that his pantomimes were all alike. The "naive scenarios" that "limited" his acting, according to his Czech biographer, Jaroslav Švehla, "did little more than group together and repeat traditional, threadbare, primitive, and in many cases absurd situations and mimic gags (cascades), insulting to even a slightly refined taste." And Adriane Despot, author of "Jean-Gaspard Deburau and the Pantomime at the Théâtre des Funambules", agrees: "most of the pantomimes are essentially the same; they share the atmosphere of light, small-scale, nonsensical adventures enlivened with comic dances, ridiculous battles, and confrontations placed in a domestic or otherwise commonplace setting." But Despot was familiar only with a handful of the scenarios, those few in print; by far the greater number, which present a picture of the pantomime rather different from Despot's, are in manuscript in the Archives Nationales de France and in the library of the Société des Auteurs et Compositeurs Dramatiques. And Švehla is proceeding along misguided lines by assuming that Deburau "longed to represent a better character" than Pierrot: Deburau was apparently proud of his work at the Funambules, characterizing it to George Sand as an "art" (see next section below). "He loved it passionately", Sand wrote, "and spoke of it as of a grave thing."

The fact is that four distinct kinds of commedia-related pantomime held the stage at the Funambules, and for each Deburau created a now subtly, now dramatically different Pierrot.

- The Rustic Pantomime: gesturing towards Pierrot's roots outside the commedia dell'arte, to the peasant Pierrot of bucolic tradition (such as Molière's Pierrot of Don Juan [1665]), the action of these scenarios is set in a hamlet or village. Pierrot is the hero: he is honest, good-hearted, but poor (and egotistically, comically naïve). Through an act of courage, he is able to overcome the scruples of the father of his beloved—a Lisette, or Finetta, or Babette—and win her at the dénouement. Examples: The Cossacks, or The Farm Set Ablaze (1840); Pierrot's Wedding (1845).
- The Melo-Pantomime: finding their inspiration in the popular boulevard melodramas having no connection with the commedia dell'arte, these scenarios present Pierrot, not as a hero, but as a subaltern—often a soldier, sometimes a retainer working in the employ of the hero of the piece. They are set in exotic locales—Africa, America, Malta, China—and the action is (or is meant to be) thrillingly dramatic, fraught with villainous abductions, violent clashes, and spectacular rescues and reversals of fortune, often brought about by Pierrot's cleverness and daring. Examples: The Enchanted Pagoda (1845); The Algerian Corsaire, or The Heroine of Malta (1845).
- The Realistic Pantomime: these are the pieces with which Despot seems most familiar. They are set in commonplace urban locales (shops, salons, public streets) and are usually peopled with the Parisian bourgeoisie (shopkeepers, merchants, valets). Pierrot is the center of attention in these scenarios, but it is a Pierrot that is often very different from the character thus-far described. "Libidinous and unscrupulous", writes Robert Storey, "often spiteful and cruel, he is redeemed only by his criminal innocence." He steals from a benefactress, takes outrageous advantage of a blind man, kills a peddler to procure the garments in which he presumes to court a duchess. This is the Pierrot described by Charles Nodier as a "naive and clownish Satan". (only when the pantomime has been written by Deburau himself, such as La Baleine [The Whale] of 1833, do we encounter, predictably, a less devilish Pierrot—one in fact deserving of Columbine's hand). Examples: Pierrot and His Creditors (1836); Pierrot and the Blind Man (1841).
- The Pantomimic Fairy-Play: the grandest and most popular class of pantomimes—it occupied a third of the Funambules' repertoire—of which there are three subclasses:
  - The Pantomimic Pierrotique Fairy-Play: Pierrot is the only commedia dell'arte character (except Cassander, who sometimes puts in an appearance). Like the action in the other subclasses, the plot here unfolds in fairyland, which is populated by sorcerers and sorceresses, ogres and magicians, fairies and enchanters. Pierrot is usually sent on a quest, sometimes to achieve an amatory goal (for himself or his master), sometimes to prove his mettle, sometimes to redress an injustice. The settings are fantastic and gothic, the action bizarre and frenetic, and the comedy very broad. Examples: The Sorcerer, or The Demon-Protector (1838); Pierrot and the Bogeyman, or The Ogres and the Brats (1840).
  - The Pantomimic Harlequinesque Fairy-Play: the basis for the pantomimes still performed at Bakken in Denmark. In the landscape described above (and populated by the same warring spirits), Harlequin, the lover, carries Columbine off, triggering a pursuit by her papa, Cassander, and his serving-man Pierrot. The end of their adventures is, of course, their union, reluctantly blessed by their pursuers. Examples: Pierrot Everywhere (1839); The Three Hunchbacks (1842).
  - The Pantomimic Harlequinesque Fairy-Play in the English Style: borrows the "opening" of early nineteenth-century English pantomime: at the rise of curtain, two suitors are in dispute for the same young lady, and her father, a miser, chooses the richer of the two. A fairy appears to protect the sentimentally more deserving (Harlequin, after his transformation)—and to change all the characters into the commedia types. Then begins the chase. Examples: The Ordeals (1833); Love and Folly, or The Mystifying Bell (1840).

== Myths about Deburau ==
=== The people's Pierrot ===
If Deburau is known today, he is known as the Deburau of Children of Paradise. There he is an exemplar of the common people, a tragic long-suffering lover, a friend of the pure and lonely and distant moon. In Reality neither Deburau nor his Pierrot was such a figure. The myth was the product of clever journalism and idealizing romance. George Sand noted, after Deburau's death, that the "titis", the street boys of the Funambules, regarded Pierrot as their "model".

=== The tragic Pierrot ===
In 1842, a pantomime was performed at the Funambules in which Pierrot meets a tragic end. At the final curtain of The Ol' Clo's Man (Le Marrrchand d'habits!), Pierrot dies on stage. It was an unprecedented dénouement and one not to be repeated, at least at Deburau's theater (imagine the Little Tramp expiring at the end of one of Charlie Chaplin's films). It was also an anomaly for which his romantic admirers were responsible. This pantomime had been invented by Théophile Gautier in a "review" that he had published in the Revue de Paris. He conceived it in the "realistic" vein described above: Pierrot, having fallen in love with a duchess, kills an old-clothes man to secure the garments with which to court her. At the wedding, however, à la the Commander of Don Juan, the ghost of the peddler—the murdering sword protruding from his chest—rises up to dance with the bridegroom. And Pierrot is fatally impaled.

The temptation to use such material, devised by such an illustrious poet, was irresistible to the managers of the Funambules, and the "review" was immediately turned into a pantomime (probably by the administrator of the theater, Cot d'Ordan). It was not a success: it had a seven-night run, a poor showing for one of Baptiste's productions. If he indeed appeared in the piece—the matter is under dispute—he did so very reluctantly. It was never revived at the Funambules.

But like Banville's deathless prose, it was Gautier's "review" that survived—and prospered. Gautier's ex-son-in-law, Catulle Mendès, refashioned it into a pantomime in 1896, and when Sacha Guitry wrote his play Deburau (1918) he included it as the only specimen of the mime's art. Carné did the same in Le Enfants du Paradis.

=== The moonstruck Pierrot ===
Deburau's Romantic admirers often made the association with the clown and the moon. Banville's poem "Pierrot" (1842) concludes with these lines: "The white Moon with its horns like a bull / Peeps behind the scenes / At its friend Jean Gaspard Deburau." As the century progressed, the association grew stronger. Albert Giraud's Pierrot lunaire (1884) marked a watershed in the moon-maddening of Pierrot, as did the song-cycle that Arnold Schoenberg derived from it (1912).
