= Jacques Castelot =

French actor (1914–1989)

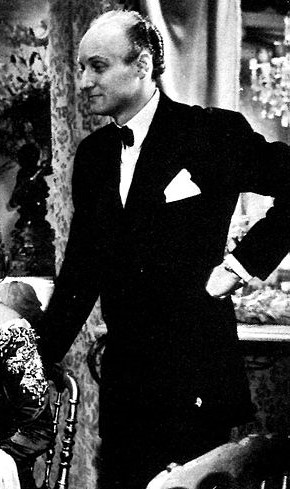
- Born: Jacques Marie Paul Éloi Storms; 11 July 1914; Antwerp, Belgium
- Died: 25 August 1989 (aged 75); Paris, France
- Occupation: Actor
- Years active: 1938–1988
- Spouse: Héléna Bossis (m. 1940; div. 1945)
- Relatives: Maurice Chabas (father); André Castelot (brother)

Jacques Castelot, born Jacques Marie Paul Éloi Storms (French: [ʒak kastəlo]; 11 July 1914 – 25 August 1989) was a French film actor. He appeared in more than 80 films between 1938 and 1982. His brother was the writer André Castelot and their father was the Symbolist painter Maurice Chabas. From 1940 to 1945 he was married to actress and theater director Héléna Bossis (pseudonym of Henriette Berthe Blanche Berriau). In 1954, he married Nicole Gérard (daughter of the racing driver Louis Gérard), to whom he remained married for the rest of his life.

== Selected filmography ==
- La Marseillaise (1938)
- Love Cavalcade (1939) − Un danseur (uncredited)
- Strange Inheritance (1943) − Jean Plantel
- Monsieur des Lourdines (1943) − Le prince Stimov
- La Malibran (1944) − Lamartine
- The Island of Love (1944) − L'ami de Xénia
- Children of Paradise (1945) − Georges
- Pamela (1945) − Le prince de Carency
- Pour une nuit d'amour (1947) − Le comte de Vétheuil
- Captain Blomet (1947) − Rodolphe
- Route sans issue (1948) − Larsac
- The Murdered Model (1948) − Emile
- Convicted (1948) − Le docteur Yvarne
- Dilemma of Two Angels (1948) − Le Vicomte
- Marlene (1949) − Breteville
- Maya (1949) − Ernest
- Le grand rendez−vous (1950) − Forestier
- The Paris Waltz (1950) − Le duc de Morny
- Cartouche, King of Paris (1950) − Le duc du Maine
- No Pity for Women (1950) − Le juge d'instruction
- Justice Is Done (1950) = Gilbert de Montesson − le 1er juré
- Topaze (1951) − Roger Gaëtan de Bersac
- Victor (1951) − Marc Pélicier
- The Little Cardinals (1951) − Le baron des Glaïeuls
- Dirty Hands (1951) − Le Prince
- The Most Beautiful Girl in the World (1951) − Gabory − le président
- La Vérité sur Bébé Donge (1952) − Docteur Jalabert
- The Adventures of Mandrin (1952) − Baron de Villemure
- Forbidden Fruit (1952) − Boquet − le propriétaire du 'Poker bar'
- My Husband Is Marvelous (1952) − Christian
- The Adventurer of Chad (1953) − Commissaire Lotte
- The Other Side of Paradise (1953) − Gabriel Dautrand
- The Adventurer of Chad (1953)
- It's the Paris Life (1954)
- The Count of Monte Cristo (1954) − Gérard de Villefort
- Before the Deluge (1954) − Serge de Montesson
- Les révoltés de Lomanach (1954) − M. de Rocheville
- The Women Couldn't Care Less (1954) − Granworth Aymes
- Magnificent Obsession (1954) − Me Ritter
- One Bullet Is Enough (1954) − Me Fidler
- The Two Orphans (1954) − Marquis de Presles
- The Lovers of Manon Lescaut (1954) − Marchese de Boysson
- Casta Diva (1954) − Ernesto Tosi
- Nana (1955) − Duc de Vandeuvres
- The Adventures of Gil Blas (1956) − Marquis de Mosquera
- Meeting in Paris (1956) − Marquis Arnaud de Cernay
- Suspicion (1956) − Thierry de Villesec
- La garçonne (1957)
- Folies−Bergère (1957) − Philippe Loiselet
- The Mysteries of Paris (1957) − notaio Ferrand, ovvero 'Monsieur'
- C'est une fille de Paname (1957) − Jean Paget
- Ces dames préfèrent le mambo (1957) − Gérard Lester − l'adjoint deLegrand
- Le souffle du désir (1958) − Mario
- Prisoner of the Volga (1959) − Jakowlew
- Le secret du Chevalier d'Éon (1959) − Le marquis de l'Hospital
- Marie of the Isles (1959) − Le comte Cheneau de Saint−André
- The Baron of the Locks (1960) − Marquis François−Marie de Villamayor
- Austerlitz (1960) − Cambacérès
- The Warrior Empress (1960) − Soldier (uncredited)
- Dans l'eau qui fait des bulles (1961) − Baumann
- La Fayette (1962) − Duc d'Ayen
- Hardi Pardaillan! (1964) − Le roi Henri III
- Du grabuge chez les veuves (1964) − Cyril
- Comment épouser un premier ministre (1964) − Un ministre d'État
- Angélique, Marquise des Anges (1964) − L'archevêque de Toulouse Pierre de Marca
- Les gros bras (1964) − Otto Werner
- The Two Orphans (1965) − Le marquis de Presle
- The Second Twin (1966) − Le procureur
- Brigade antigangs (1966) − Le directeur de la P.J.
- Red Roses for Angelica (1966) − Count d'Artois
- Maldonne (1969) − Le chef des justiciers
- La battaglia del deserto (1969)
- Le Temps des loups (1970) as Investigating Judge
- Vertige pour un tueur (1970) − Mario
- Point de chute (1970) − Le père
- Love Me Strangely (1971)
- Sapho ou La fureur d'aimer (1971) − L'oncle Edouard
- Repeated Absences (1972) − Le directeur de la banque
- Décembre (1973)
- La mer couleur de larmes (1980) − Le père René
