= Children of Paradise =

1945 French film

- Directed by: Marcel Carné
- Written by: Jacques Prévert
- Produced by: Raymond Borderie; Fred Orain
- Starring: Arletty; Jean-Louis Barrault; Pierre Brasseur; Pierre Renoir; Marcel Herrand
- Cinematography: Roger Hubert
- Edited by: Henri Rust
- Music by: Maurice Thiriet; Joseph Kosma
- Distributed by: Pathé Consortium Cinéma
- Release date: 9 March 1945
- Running time: 190 minutes
- Country: France
- Language: French
- Box office: 4,768,505 admissions (France)

Children of Paradise (French: Les Enfants du paradis, [lez‿ɑ̃fɑ̃ dy paʁadi]) is a two-part French romantic drama film by Marcel Carné, produced under war conditions in 1943, 1944, and early 1945. Set in the theatrical world of 1830s Paris, it tells the story of a courtesan and four men—a mime, an actor, a criminal and an aristocrat—who love her in entirely different ways.

It has received universal critical acclaim and is considered one of the greatest films of all time. Nouvelle Vague director François Truffaut declared, "I would give up all my films to have directed Les Enfants du Paradis". In Truman Capote's The Duke in His Domain (1957), actor Marlon Brando called it "maybe the best movie ever made". Its original American trailer positioned it as the French answer to Gone With the Wind (1939), an opinion shared by critic David Shipman. A 1995 poll of 600 French critics and industry professionals voted it the best French film ever made.

== Title ==
As noted by one critic, "in French, 'paradis' is also the colloquial name for the gallery or second balcony in a theatre, where common people sat and viewed a play, responding to it honestly and boisterously. The actors played to these gallery gods, hoping to win their favour, the actor himself thus being elevated to an Olympian status." The film contains many shots of the audience hanging over the edge of these balconies (which are similarly known as "the gods" in the British theatre), and screenwriter Jacques Prévert stated that the title "refers to the actors ... and the audiences too, the good-natured, working-class audience."

== Story ==
=== Précis ===
Children of Paradise is set in the theatrical world of Paris during the July Monarchy (1830–1848), centered on the area around the Funambules theatre, situated on the Boulevard du Temple – pejoratively referred to as the "Boulevard du Crime". The story revolves around a beautiful and charismatic courtesan, Garance (Arletty). Four men – the mime Baptiste Deburau (Jean-Louis Barrault), the actor Frédérick Lemaître (Pierre Brasseur), the thief Pierre François Lacenaire (Marcel Herrand), and the aristocrat Édouard de Montray (Louis Salou) – are in love with Garance, and their intrigues drive the story forward. Garance is briefly intrigued/involved with them all, but leaves them when they attempt to force her to love on their terms, rather than her own. The mime Baptiste is the one who suffers the most in pursuit of the unattainable Garance.

=== Sources ===
The four men courting Garance are all based on real French personalities of the 1820s and 1830s. Baptiste Deburau was a famous mime and Frédérick Lemaître was an acclaimed actor on the "Boulevard of Crime" depicted in the film. Pierre Lacenaire was an infamous French criminal, and the character of the Comte Édouard de Montray was inspired by the Duc de Morny.

The idea for making a movie based on these characters came from a chance meeting between Carné and Jean-Louis Barrault, in Nice, during which Barrault pitched the idea of making a movie based on Deburau and Lemaître. Carné, who at the time was hesitant about which movie to direct next, proposed this idea to his friend Jacques Prévert. Prévert was initially reluctant to write a movie about a mime, "Jacques hated pantomime" his brother once said, but Barrault assured Prévert, that he and his teacher Étienne Decroux, who plays Baptiste's father in the film, would take responsibility for developing the mime sequences. According to Trauner, Prévert then saw an opportunity to include the character of Lacenaire, the "dandy du crime", who fascinated him. The Germans were then occupying the whole of France, and Prévert is rumoured to have said "They will not let me do a movie about Lacenaire, but I can put Lacenaire in a film about Deburau". The script incorporates quotations from Lacenaire's autobiography.

=== Plot summary ===
Children of Paradise is divided into two parts, Boulevard du Crime ("Boulevard of Crime") and L'Homme Blanc ("The Man in White"). The first begins around 1827, the second about seven years later. The action takes place mainly in the neighbourhood of the Boulevard du Temple in Paris, nicknamed "Boulevard of Crime" because of all the melodramas and bloody scenarios offered to the largely plebeian public each evening. There are two principal theatres: the Théâtre des Funambules ("Theatre of Tightrope Walkers") specializes in pantomime, since the authorities do not allow it to use spoken dialogue, which is reserved for the "official" venue, the Grand Theatre.

Part I: Boulevard of Crime
A young actor and womaniser, Frédérick Lemaître, dreams of becoming a star. He meets and flirts with Garance, a beautiful woman who earns her living by modestly exhibiting her physical charms in a carnival show. Garance staves off Frédérick's advances and goes to visit one of her acquaintances, Pierre-François Lacenaire, a rebel in revolt against society. Lacenaire is a proud, dangerous individual who works as a scrivener to cover his organized criminal enterprises. Shortly thereafter, Garance is accused of stealing a man's gold watch while she is watching a pantomime featuring Baptiste Deburau and a barker (Baptiste's father) in front of the Funambules Theatre. Lacenaire is in fact the guilty party. Baptiste, dressed up as the stock character Pierrot, saves her from the police by silently acting out the theft, which he has just witnessed. He reveals a great talent, a veritable vocation for pantomime, but falls immediately and irremediably in love with Garance, saving a flower she thanked him with. In the background, there is a price list for various seats, including Paradise, which is visible over the mime's shoulder.

Baptiste's father is one of the stars at the Funambules. The daughter of the theatre director, Nathalie, who is a mime also, is deeply in love with Baptiste. Before the performance that evening, a used-clothes peddler named Jéricho reads in her palm that she will marry the man she loves, as he knew her father was worried about her mood affecting her performances. When a fight breaks out that evening between two rival clans of actors, Baptiste and Frédérick manage to calm the crowd down by improvising a mime act, thus saving the day's receipts. The most enthusiastic of the spectators are those seated in "paradise" (paradis), a term denoting in French theatrical language the top floor of the balcony, where the cheapest seats are located.

Later that night, Baptiste catches sight of Garance with Lacenaire and his accomplices in a seedy restaurant/dancehall, "Le Rouge Gorge" (a pun: this means "The Robin" or "The Red Breast", but literally translates as "The Red Throat", a reference to the previous owner's throat having been slit). When he invites Garance to dance, he is thrown out of the restaurant by Avril, one of Lacenaire's thugs. He turns the situation around and leaves with Garance, for whom he finds a room at the same boarding house where he and Frédérick live. After declaring his love, Baptiste flees Garance's room when she says she doesn't feel the same way, despite her clear invitation to stay. When Frédérick hears Garance singing in her room, which is next to his, he quickly joins her.

Baptiste becomes the star of the Funambules; fuelled by his passion, he writes several very popular pantomimes, performing with Garance and Frédérick, who are now lovers. Baptiste is tormented by their affair, while Nathalie, who is convinced that she and Baptiste are "made for each other", suffers from his lack of love for her.

Garance is visited in her dressing room by the Count Édouard de Montray, a wealthy and cynical dandy who offers her his fortune if she will agree to be his mistress. Garance is repelled by him and mockingly rejects his proposition. The Count nonetheless offers her his protection if the need were to arise. She is later unjustly suspected of complicity in an abortive robbery and murder attempt by Lacenaire and Avril. To avoid arrest she is forced to appeal to Count Édouard for protection. The first part of the film comes to an end with this development.

Part II: The Man in White
Several years later, Frédérick is the star of the Grand Theatre. A man about town and a spendthrift, he is burdened with debts – which don't prevent him from devastating the mediocre play in which he currently has the main role by exposing it to ridicule in rehearsal and then playing it for laughs, rather than straight melodrama, on opening night. Despite achieving a smashing success, the play's three fussy authors are outraged and challenge him to a duel. He accepts and when he returns to his dressing room, Frédérick is confronted by Lacenaire, who apparently intends to rob and kill him. However, the criminal is an amateur playwright and strikes up a friendship with the actor instead. He and Avril serve as Frédérick's seconds the next morning, when the actor arrives at the duel dead drunk.

Baptiste is enjoying even greater success as a mime at the Funambules. When Frédérick goes to a performance the day after surviving the duel, he is surprised to find himself in the same box as Garance. His old flame has returned to Paris after having travelled throughout the world with the Count de Montray, who has kept her these several years. She has been attending the Funambules every night incognito to watch Baptiste perform. She knows she has always been genuinely in love with him. Frédérick suddenly finds himself jealous for the first time in his life. While the feeling is highly unpleasant, he remarks that his jealousy will help him as an actor. He will finally be able to play the role of Othello, having now experienced the emotions which motivate the character. Garance asks Frédérick to tell Baptiste of her presence, but Nathalie, now Baptiste's wife, is first informed by the spiteful rag-man Jéricho. She sends their small son to Garance's box to mortify her with their family's happiness. By the time Frédérick alerts Baptiste and he rushes to find her, the box is empty.

When Garance returns to the Count's luxurious mansion, she finds Lacenaire waiting for her. Lacenaire satisfies himself that Garance has no love for him and, on his way out, encounters the Count, who is irritated to see such an individual in his home. Lacenaire reacts to the Count's challenge with threats, revealing the knife at his belt. Later, Garance declares to the Count that she will never love him since she is already in love with another man, but declares she will continue to try to please him, and offers to spread the word on the streets that she is "mad" about him, if he would like.

Frédérick has finally achieved his dream of playing the role of Othello. The Count, who insists on attending the performance with Garance, is convinced that the actor is the man she loves. At a break in the play, the Count coolly mocks Frédérick, trying to provoke him into a duel. Elsewhere Baptiste, who is also in the audience, encounters Garance at last. When Lacenaire takes Frédérick's side in the verbal jousting, the Count attempts to humiliate him as well. Lacenaire takes revenge by calling him a cuckold and, dramatically pulling back a curtain, reveals Garance in Baptiste's embrace on the balcony. The two lovers slip away to spend the night together in Garance's former room at the Great Post House.

The next morning, at a hammam, Lacenaire assassinates the Count. He then calmly sits to wait for the police and meet his "destiny", which is to die on the scaffold. At the rooming house, Nathalie walks in on Baptiste and Garance. Garance is in a hurry to exit in order to prevent the duel between Frédérick and the Count, who she is unaware has been murdered, but Nathalie blocks her way, insisting that leaving is easy, while to stay and share someone's everyday life, as she has for the past six years with Baptiste, is much more difficult. Garance responds that she has lived with Baptiste for six years as well, that she felt him every day and night even though she was with another. Nathalie dismisses Garance's experience as unimportant and moves past her to Baptiste, allowing Garance to leave. Nathalie pleads with Baptiste for reassurance as he attempts to follow Garance. Baptiste pushes past her and is soon lost in the frantic Carnival crowd amid a sea of bobbing masks and unheeding, white Pierrots. The film ends as a desperate Baptiste is swept away with the crowd and Garance leaves in her carriage, her face impassive.

== Cast ==
- Arletty as Claire "Garance" Reine
- Jean-Louis Barrault as Baptiste Deburau
- Pierre Brasseur as Frédérick Lemaître
- Marcel Herrand as Pierre-François Lacenaire
- Pierre Renoir as Jéricho
- María Casares as Nathalie (credited as María Casarès)
- Louis Salou as Comte Édouard de Montray
- Gaston Modot as Fil de Soie
- Fabien Loris as Avril
- Marcel Pérès as Director of the Funambules
- Pierre Palau as Stage manager of the Funambules
- Etienne Decroux as Anselme Deburau (credited as Étienne Decroux)
- Jane Marken as Mme. Hermine (credited as Jeanne Marken)
- Marcelle Monthil as Marie
- Louis Florencie as Policeman
- Raymond Rognoni as Director, 'Grand Theatre'
- Jacques Castelot as George
- Paul Frankeur as Police Inspector
- Albert Rémy as Scarpia Barrigni
- Robert Dhéry as Celestin
- Auguste Boverio as First Author
- Paul Demange as Second Author

== Production ==
The film was made under extremely difficult conditions. External sets in Nice were badly damaged by natural causes, exacerbated and compounded by the theatrical constraints stemming from the German occupation of France during World War II. The film was split into two parts because the distributor, Gaumont, could only screen a three hour film half as many times as usual. By making the film a pseudo double feature, the distributor could charge eighty-francs per admission, double the usual amount, therefore making up the shortfall.

Barrault nearly missed performing in the film. He was committed at the time to the theatrical premiere of The Satin Slipper (Le Soulier de satin), which became a hit. He almost offered his role of Baptiste to a music hall entertainer, Jacques Tati, then little known, before a revised film production schedule was negotiated that allowed Barrault to fulfill both roles.

According to film critic Pauline Kael, it was alleged that "the starving extras made away with some of the banquets before they could be photographed". Many of the 1,800 extras were Resistance agents using the film as daytime cover. Until the liberation of France, they had to mingle with collaborators and Vichy sympathisers imposed on the production by the authorities. Alexandre Trauner, who designed the sets, and Joseph Kosma, who composed the music, were Jewish and had to work in secrecy throughout the production. Music was provided by the Orchestre de la Société des Concerts du Conservatoire under the direction of conductor Charles Münch, who contributed part of his income to the French Resistance. Trauner lived (under an assumed name) with Carné and Prévert during the six months it took them to prepare the script. Maurice Thiriet, Kosma's orchestrator, acted as his front.

The set builders were short of supplies and the camera crew's film stock was rationed. The financing, originally a French-Italian production, collapsed a few weeks after production began in Nice, due to the Allied conquest of Sicily in August 1943. Around this time, the Nazis forbade producer André Paulvé from working on the film because of his remote Jewish ancestry, and production was suspended for three months. The French company Pathé took over the film, whose cost was escalating wildly. The quarter-mile long main set, the "Boulevard du Temple", was severely damaged by a storm and had to be rebuilt. By the time shooting resumed in Paris in early spring of 1944, the director of photography, Roger Hubert, had been assigned to another production and Philippe Agostini, who replaced him, needed to analyse all the reels in order to match the lighting of the non-sequential shot list; all the while, electricity in the Paris Studios was intermittent.

The movie also marks the first artistic collaboration between Carné and the French painter and costume designer Mayo, one that would continue over several films (Les Portes de la Nuit (1946), La Fleur de l'Age (1947), Juliette ou la Clef des Songes, Thérèse Raquin (1953), Les Tricheurs (1958)). This friend of Prévert started his work on the project very early in order to immerse himself fully in the script and the characters. The materials, provided by Jeanne Lanvin, allowed work on the costumes to be done in very favourable conditions given the difficult period of the French occupation.

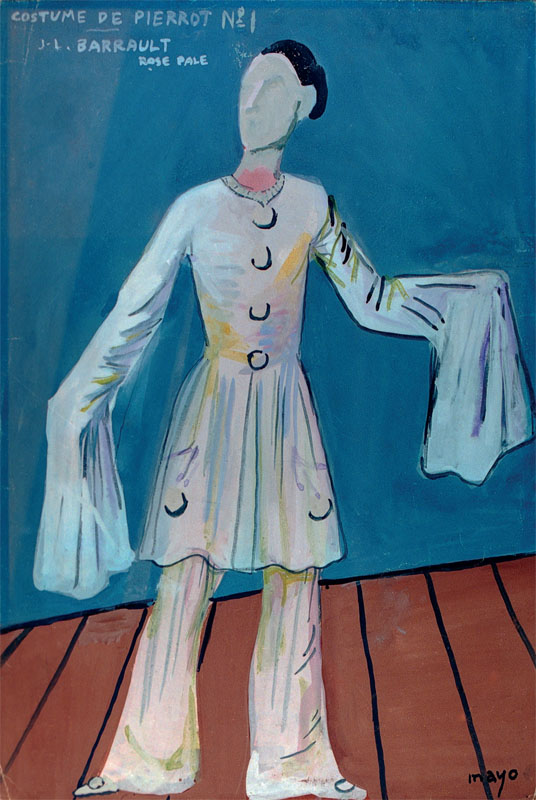
Costume of Pierrot for Baptiste by Mayo

Production was delayed again after the Allies landed in Normandy, perhaps intentionally stalled so that it would only be completed after the liberation of France. When Paris was liberated in August 1944, the actor Robert Le Vigan, cast in the role of informer-thief Jéricho, was sentenced to death by the Resistance for collaborating with the Nazis, and had to flee, along with author Céline, to Sigmaringen. He was replaced at a moment's notice by Pierre Renoir, older brother of French filmmaker Jean Renoir and son of the famous painter, and most of the scenes had to be redone. Le Vigan was tried and convicted as a Nazi collaborator in 1946. One scene featuring Le Vigan survives in the middle of the second part, when Jericho snitches to Nathalie. Carné and Prévert had hidden some of the key reels of film from the occupying forces, hoping that the liberation of Paris would have occurred when the film was ready for release.

== Reception ==
Children of Paradise was the third most popular film at the French box-office in 1945. The Variety review in December 1944 stated: "This ambitious French film turns out to be a strange mixture of the beautiful, the esoteric and the downright dull. Some startling flashes of inspired mimicry and fresh Gallic humor ... in an uneven performance of writing and direction ... Barrault is brilliantly effective as the sensitive, lovelorn mimic. Other lead parts are sharply defined and maintained consistently in a film which is a peak of thespian artistry."

As years went by, critics began to single out the film for exceptional praise. In 1947 in The Nation magazine, James Agee wrote:

Children of Paradise ... is close to perfection of its kind and I very much like its kind—the highest kind of slum-glamor romanticism about theater people and criminals, done with strong poetic feeling, with rich theatricality, with a great delight and proficiency in style, and with a kind of sophistication which merely cleans and curbs, rather than killing or smirking behind the back of its more powerful and vulgar elements.

On the review aggregator Rotten Tomatoes, 98% of 41 critics' reviews were positive, with an average rating of 9.2/10. The site's consensus reads: "Strong performances abound, and Carné's wit and grace are evident in this masterful (if long) French epic." On Metacritic, which uses a weighted average, Children of Paradise has a score of 96 out of 100 based on 20 reviews, indicating "universal acclaim".

Pauline Kael remarked that this "lushly romantic creation ... is a one-of-a-kind film, a sumptuous epic about the relations between theatre and life." Parker Tyler wrote that "Carné would be a world-ranking director with this film alone." British critic Leslie Halliwell bestowed a rare four-out-of-four stars rating on the film, calling it "A magnificent evocation of a place and period, this thoroughly enjoyable epic melodrama is flawed only by its lack of human warmth and of a real theme. It remains nevertheless one of the cinema's most memorable films." Leonard Maltin was also enthusiastic, lauding it as a "Timeless masterpiece of filmmaking (and storytelling), focusing on a rough-and-tumble theatrical troupe in 19th-century France ... Wise, witty, and completely captivating." In 2002, Roger Ebert gave the film four out of four stars and added it to his Great Movies list, writing of it, "few achievements in the world of cinema can equal it". Time magazine included Children of Paradise in a 2005 All-Time 100 list of the greatest films made since 1923.

In The Sight and Sound Greatest Films of All Time 2012, Children of Paradise was ranked at 73rd in the critic's poll. In the 2022 edition of the poll, the film received 21 votes from critics and was placed in 136th place. It also received 3 votes from directors Geoff Dunbar, Bart Layton, and Gary Oldman.

== Release versions ==
The film premiered in Paris at the Chaillot Palace on 9 March 1945. Carné then fought with the producers to have the film shown exclusively in two theatres (Madeleine and Colisée) instead of one, and to screen a release version that contained the film in its entirety without an intermission. He also pioneered the idea of the public being able to reserve their seats in advance. The producers accepted Carné's demands on the condition that they be able to charge double the price of admittance. Children of Paradise grew into a major success, remaining at the Madeleine Cinema for 54 weeks.

In the United States, Prévert received an Oscar nomination for Best Original Screenplay at the 19th Academy Awards in 1947; however, it is not clear which version of Children of Paradise the Academy voters were watching. Variety described the U.S. version at that time as "a 144-min., inadequately-subtitled" film being shown in New York theaters.

=== Restoration ===
In March 2012, Pathé released a restoration of the film. It required scanning the badly damaged original camera negative, and other early sources, using a high-resolution 4K digital process to produce a new master print. The restored edition was released on Blu-ray Disc in September 2012.
