= The Sinner and the Saint =

2021 book by Kevin Birmingham

The Sinner and the Saint: Dostoevsky, a Crime and Its Punishment
- Allen Lane imprint edition (Note: Penguin imprint edition is titled "The Sinner and the Saint: Dostoevsky and the Gentleman Murderer Who Inspired a Masterpiece", with a different book cover.)
- Author: Kevin Birmingham
- Language: English
- Subject: Literary criticism, biography
- Genre: Nonfiction
- Publisher: Allen Lane
- Publication date: 16 November 2021
- Publication place: United Kingdom
- Media type: Print (hardback), Digital
- Pages: 432
- ISBN: 9780241235942
- Website: penguin.co.uk

The Sinner and the Saint: Dostoevsky, a Crime and Its Punishment is a book by Kevin Birmingham. It details events in the life of Fyodor Dostoevsky and the inspiration behind his acclaimed novel, Crime and Punishment.

According to Birmingham, the protagonist Rodion Raskolnikov was partly based on a minor French poet turned murderer, Pierre François Lacenaire.

The Sinner and the Saint is the second book authored by Birmingham. His first, The Most Dangerous Book: The Battle for James Joyce’s Ulysses, originally published in 2014, won the PEN New England Award in 2015 and Truman Capote Award for Literary Criticism in 2016.
