= André Castelot =

French writer and scriptwriter

- Born: André Storms; 23 January 1911; Antwerp, Belgium
- Died: 18 July 2004 (aged 93); Neuilly-sur-Seine, France
- Occupation: Writer
- Spouse: Julienne Carré
- Relatives: Maurice Chabas (father); Gabrielle Alice Castelot (mother); Jacques Castelot (brother)

André Castelot, born André Storms (French: [ɑ̃dʁe kastəlo]; 23 January 1911, Antwerp – 18 July 2004, Neuilly-sur-Seine), was a French writer and scriptwriter born in Belgium. He was the son of the Symbolist painter Maurice Chabas and Gabrielle Storms-Castelot (née Gabrielle Alice Castelot), and the brother of the film actor Jacques Castelot. He wrote more than one hundred books, mostly biographies of famous people.

With the historian Alain Decaux he hosted the radio program La Tribune de l'Histoire on RTF from 1951 until 1997. He also collaborated with Decaux on the RTF television program La caméra explore le temps from 1956 to 1966.

He was awarded the Prix d’Académie of the Académie Française four times: in 1951 for Philippe Égalité, le prince rouge, in 1952 for Dans l’ombre de l'histoire. Souvenirs du prince de Faucigny-Lucinge, in 1954 for Marie-Antoinette and in 1984 for the body of his historical work.

== Selected works ==
- Louis XVII. L'énigme résolue (1947) - about Louis XVII
- Le mystère de Louis XVII (1953)
- Marie-Antoinette d'après des documents inédits (1953) - about Marie Antoinette
  - (UK ed.) Marie Antoinette (1957) - translation by Denise Folliot
  - (US ed.) Queen of France: A Biography of Marie Antoinette (1957)
- L'Aiglon: Napoléon Deux (1959) - about Napoleon II
  - (UK ed.) Napoleon's Son (trans. 1960) - translation by Robert Baldick
  - (US ed.) King of Rome: A Biography of Napoleon's Tragic Son (1960)
- Joséphine (1961) - about Josephine de Beauharnais
  - (trans.) Josephine. A Biography (1967) - translation by Denise Folliot
- Le Grand Siècle de Paris: De la prise de la Bastille a l'effondrement de la Commune (1955)
  - (trans.) Paris: The Turbulent City 1783–1871 (1962)
- Les Grandes Heures de Napoléon (6 vols., 1964)
- Histoire de Napoléon Bonaparte (10 vols., 1969) - about Napoleon Bonaparte
  - (trans.) Napoleon (1971)
- Napoléon III et le second empire (6 vols., 1975) - about Napoleon III
- François I (1983) - about Francis I of France
- Henri IV, le passionné (1986) - about Henry IV of France
- Grande histoire illustrée de Napoléon (9 vols., 1989)
- Fouché: Le double jeu (1990) - about Joseph Fouché
- La Reine Margot (1993) - about Margaret of Valois
- Louis-Philippe: le méconnu (1994) - about Louis Philippe I

== Adaptations ==
- Napoleon II, the Eagle (1961, film)
