= Maurice Chabas =

French painter (1862–1947)

Maurice Chabas (21 September 1862 – 11 December 1947) was a French Symbolist painter.

== Biography ==
Chabas was born in Nantes. He came from a family of painters. Being the eldest child, he had to take over the family business, although he was interested in painting. His younger brothers, Maurice and Paul, were renowned painters.

Chabas debuted his work in 1885 at the Salon, where he would continue to present his works until 1913. Chabas was a prolific and often mystical artist and participated in many Rosicrucian meetings in the 1890s. By 1895 he was the subject of an exhibition at a gallery in Paris.

In 1900, Chabas moved to Neuilly-sur-Seine, where his studio became a hub for scholars like Camille Flammarion, Charles Richet, Maurice Maeterlinck, Léon Bloy, Lucien Lévy-Brulh, Joséphin Péladan, Edouard Schuré, and René Guénon. Until he moved to Neuilly-sur-Seine, Chabas was a little-known figure. That changed after 1900, when his popularity escalated.

In 1910 he met the Belgian Gabrielle Storms-Castelot, and they had two children, the writer André Castelot and the actor Jacques Castelot. In 1917, he became a member of the Theosophical Society, although he also maintained friendships with leading Roman Catholic intellectuals such as novelist François Mauriac.

In the last years of his life, Chabas mostly cultivated his personal mysticism and lived as a recluse. He died in solitude in his Versailles home on 11 December 1947.

== Gallery ==
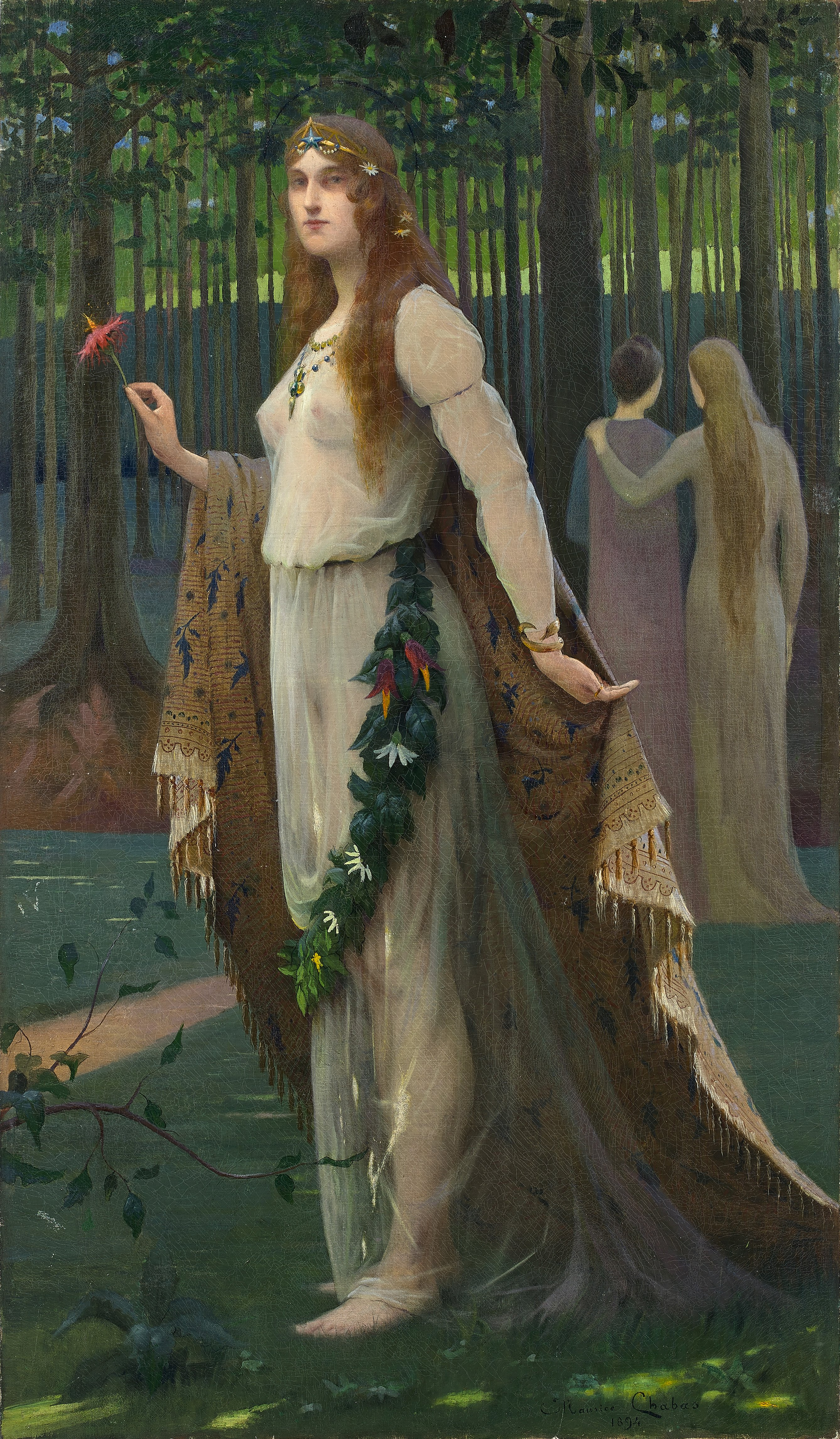
Néméa, 1894

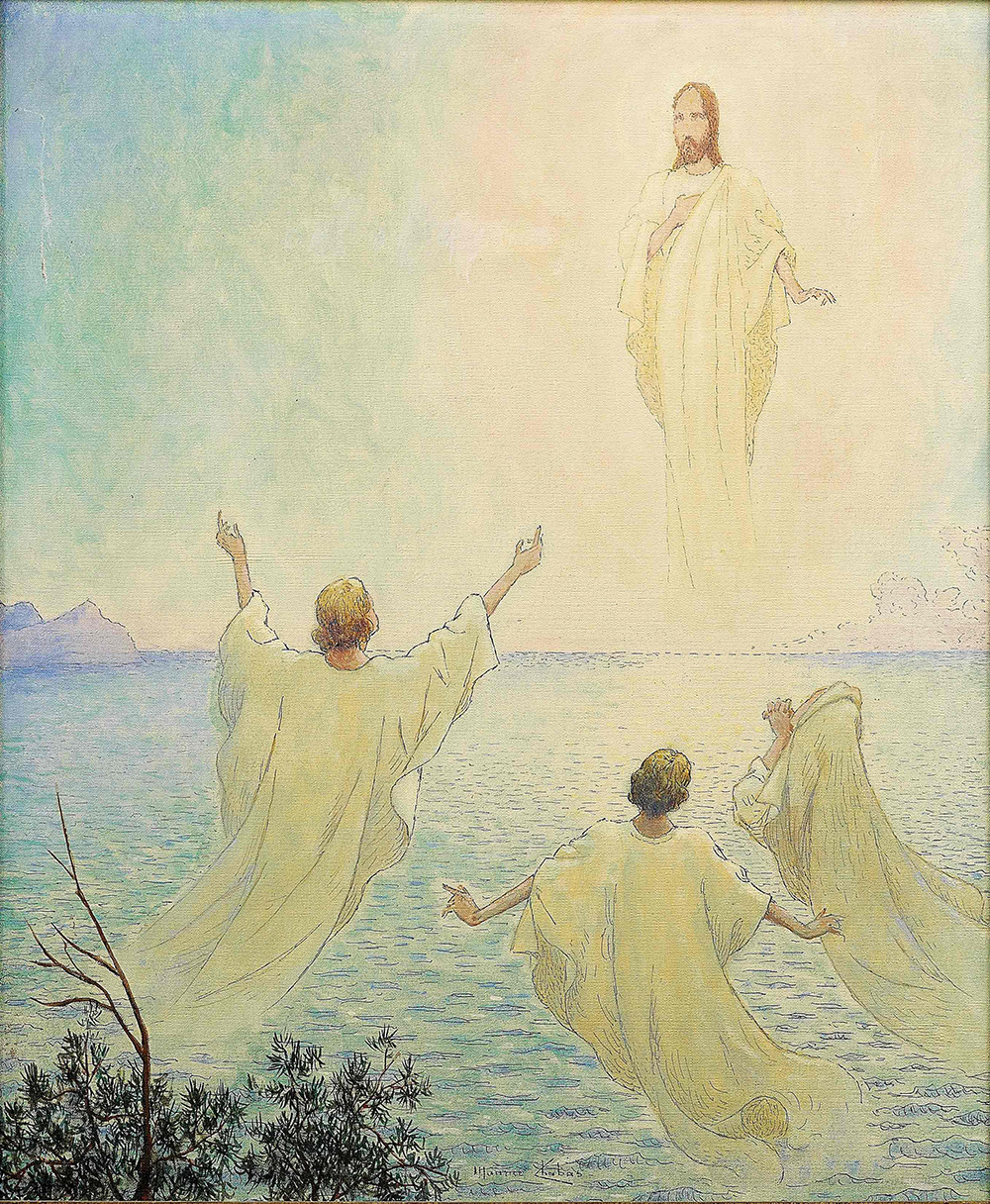
L'Apparition, circa 1900

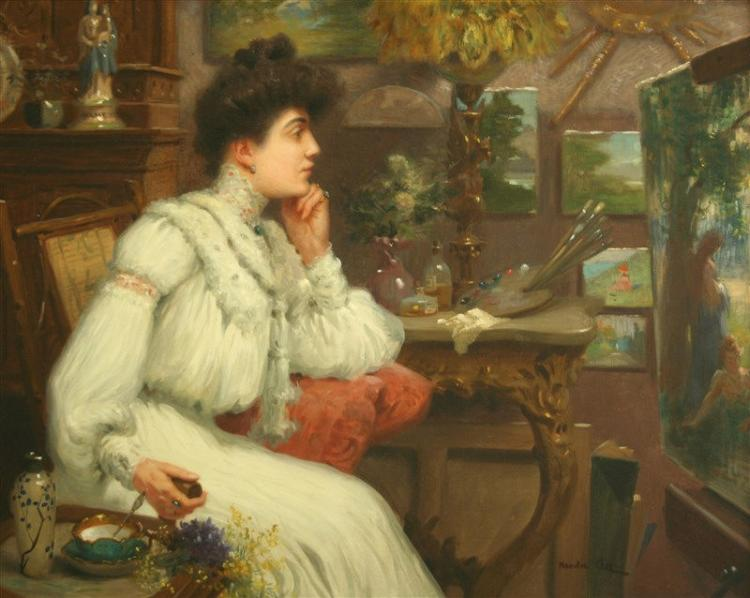
L'Élegante dans l'Atelier, circa 1900

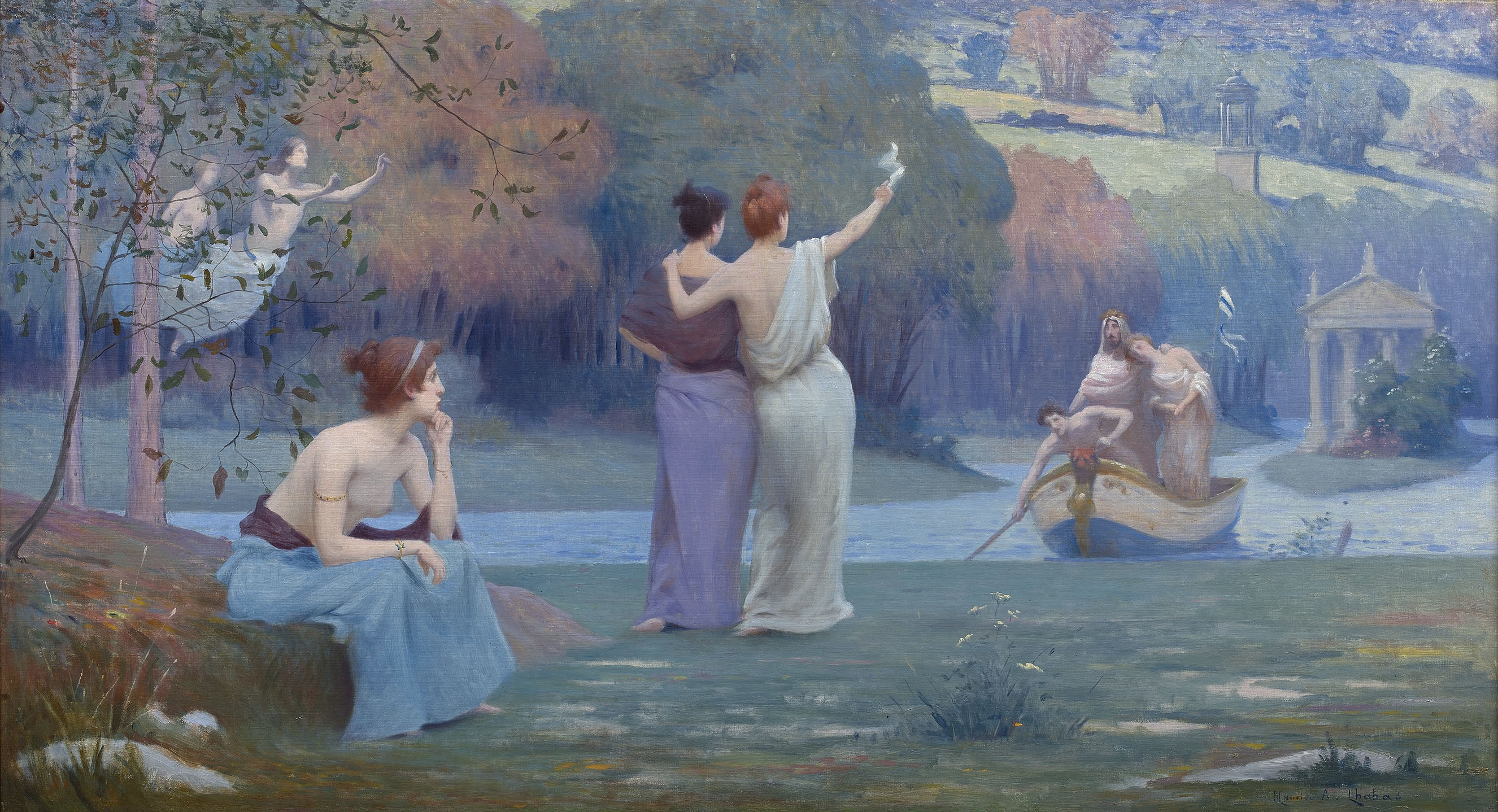
Return to Cythera, circa 1900

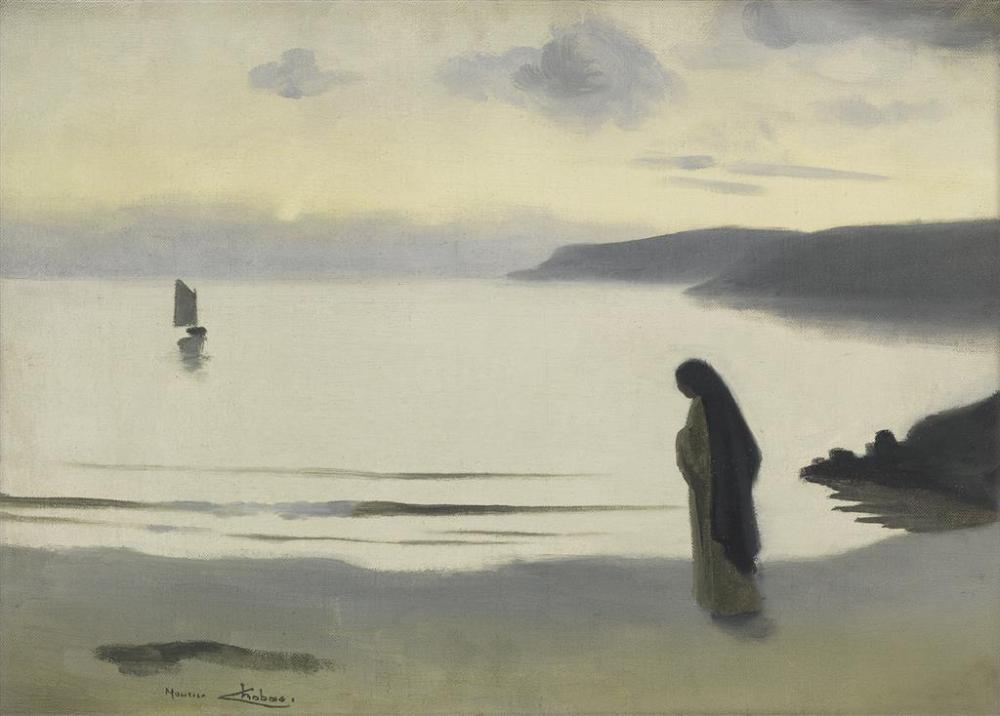
Reverie au Bord du Lac, circa 1900

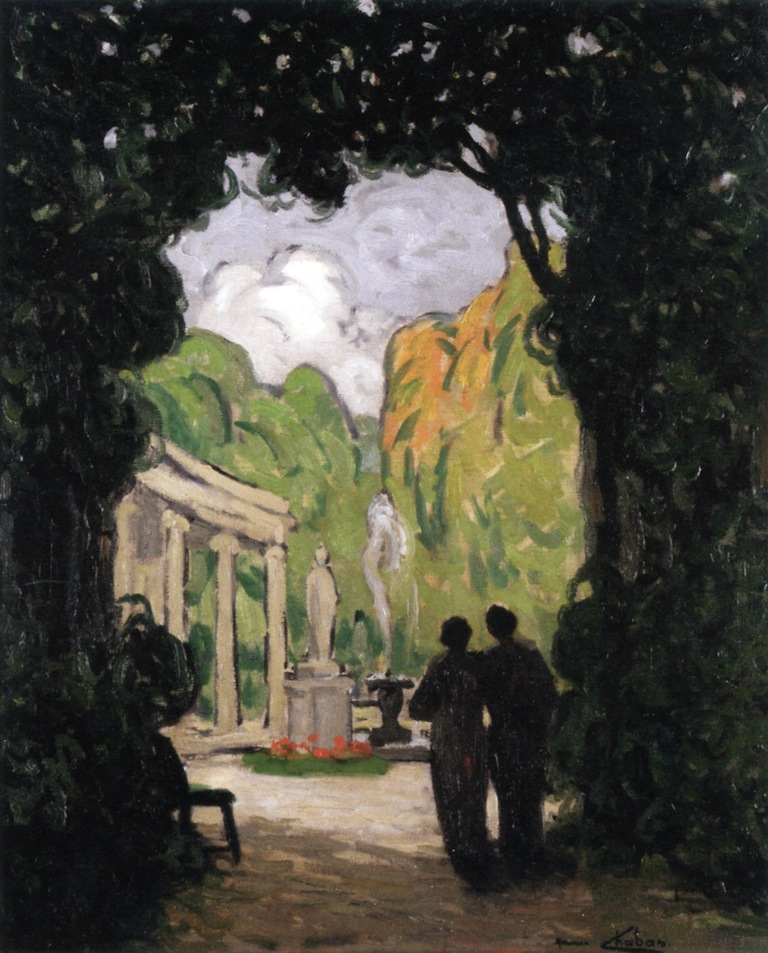
Two Women in a Park, circa 1900

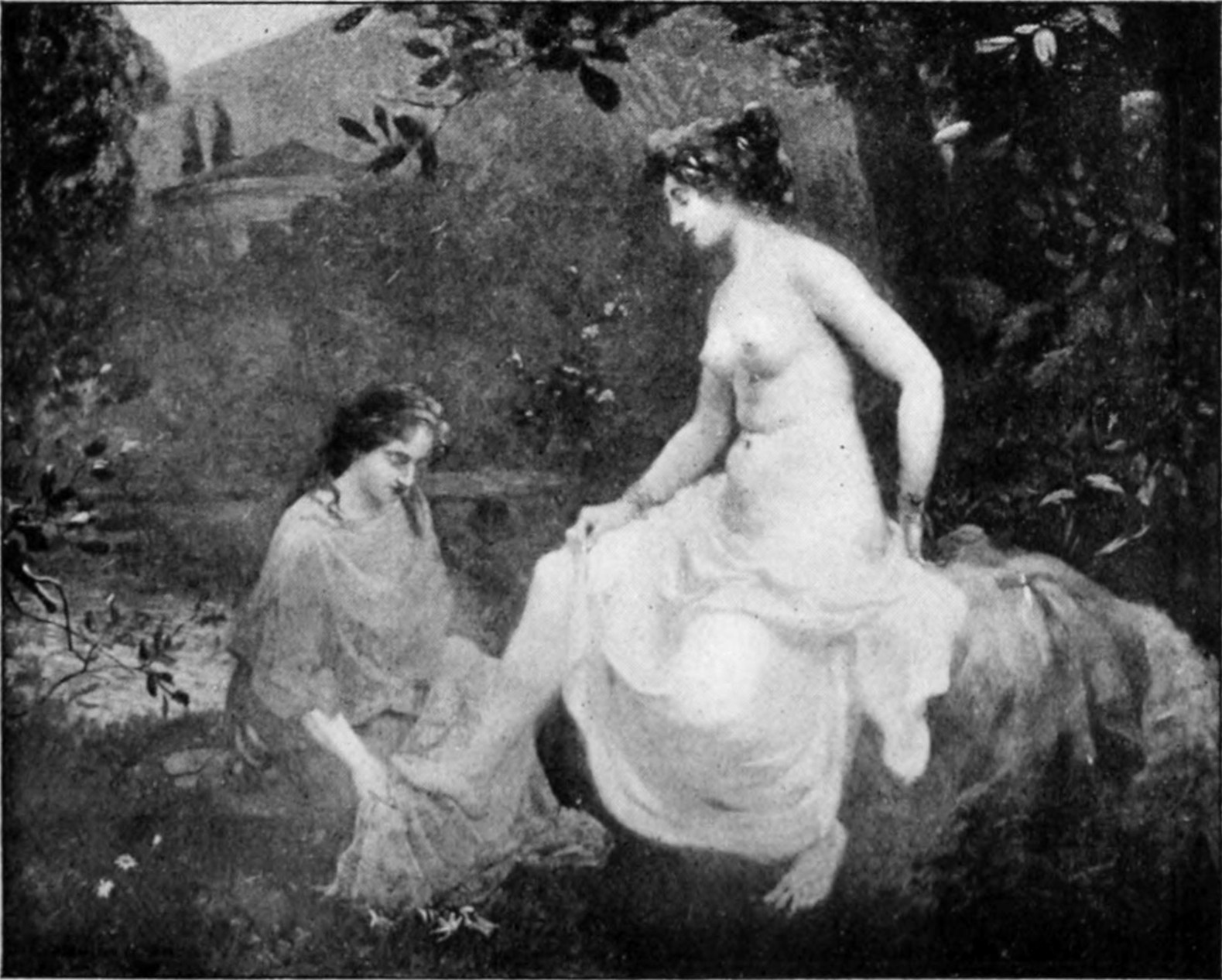
La chaste Suzanne, 1903

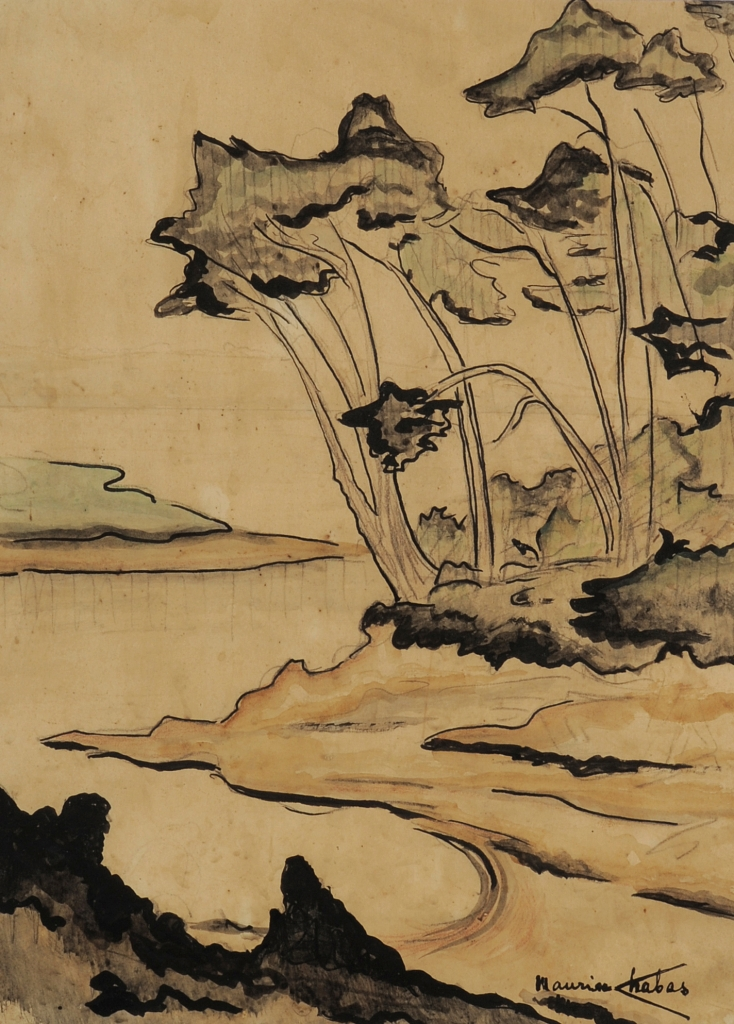
circa 1905

== Honors and awards ==
Knight of the Order of Legion of Honour
