= Frédérick Lemaître =

French actor (1800–1876)

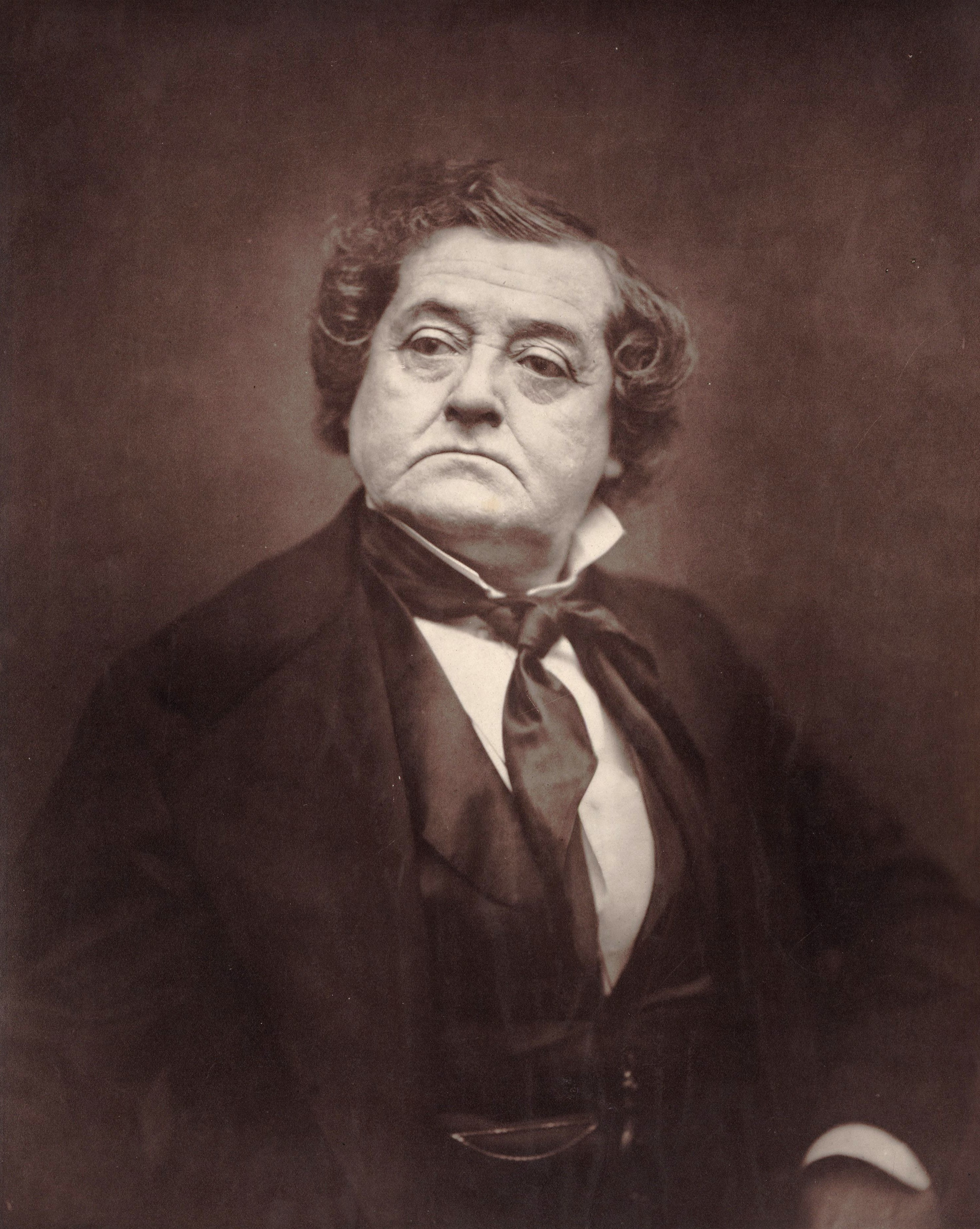
Woodburytype of Lemaître, c. 1870

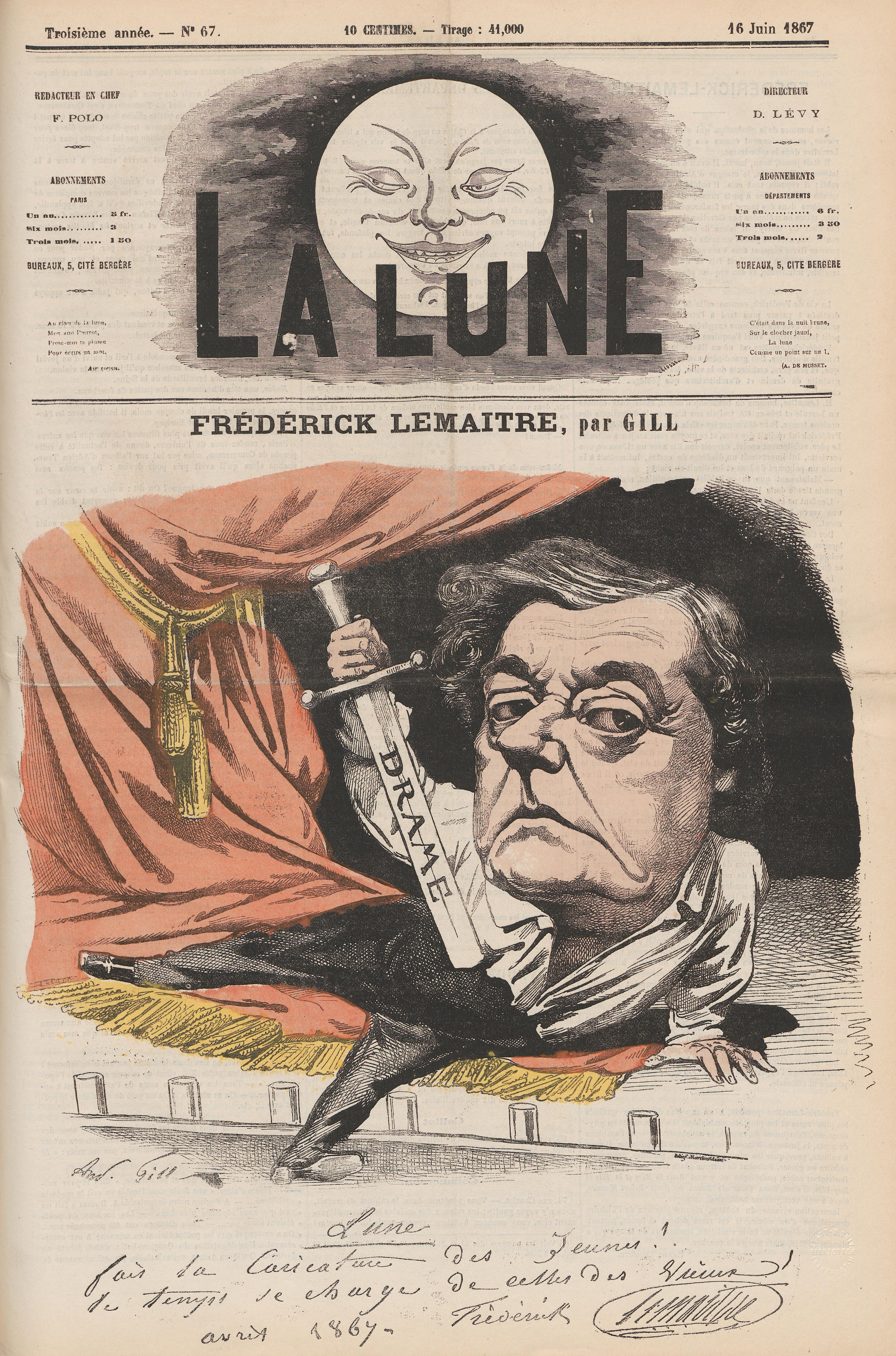
Lemaître caricatured by André Gill, 1867.

Antoine Louis Prosper "Frédérick" Lemaître (French pronunciation: [fʁedeʁik ləmɛtʁ]; 28 July 1800 – 26 January 1876) was a French actor and playwright, one of the most famous players on the celebrated Boulevard du Crime.

== Biography ==
Lemaître, the son of an architect, was born at Le Havre, Seine-Maritime. He adopted the first name "Frédérick" as a stage name. He spent two years at the Conservatoire de Paris, and made his first appearance at a variety performance in one of the basement restaurants at the Palais Royal. At the Théâtre de l'Ambigu-Comique on 12 July 1823 he played the part of Robert Macaire in L'Auberge des Adrets. The melodrama was played seriously on the first night and was received with little favor, but it was changed on the second night to burlesque, and thanks to him had a great success. All of Paris came to see it, and from that day he was famous.

He created a number of parts that added to his popularity, especially Cardillac, Cagliostro and Cartouche. His success in the last led to an engagement at the Théâtre de la Porte Saint-Martin, where in 1827 he produced Ducange's Trente ans, ou la vie d'un joueur, in which his vivid acting made a profound impression.

Afterwards at the Odéon and other theatres he passed from one success to another. In 1836, at the Théâtre des Variétés he appeared with success as the great, and recently deceased, English actor Edmund Kean in the play Kean by Alexandre Dumas, père. He put the final touch to his reputation as an artist by creating the part of Ruy Blas in Victor Hugo's play (1838).

On his return to the Porte St. Martin he created the title-role in Balzac's Vautrin, which was forbidden a second presentation, on account, it is said, of the resemblance of the actor's wig to the well-known toupé worn by Louis Philippe. His last appearance was at this theatre in 1873 as the old Jew in Marie Tudor.

He was married to the actress, Sophia Halligner, sister of the mezzo-soprano Marie-Julie Halligner. Lemaître died in 1876 in Paris and was buried in the Cimetière de Montmartre in the Montmartre Quarter.

== Popular culture references ==
- Lemaître is one of the principal characters in the famous film Les Enfants du Paradis (1945).
