= Pierre François Lacenaire =

French murderer

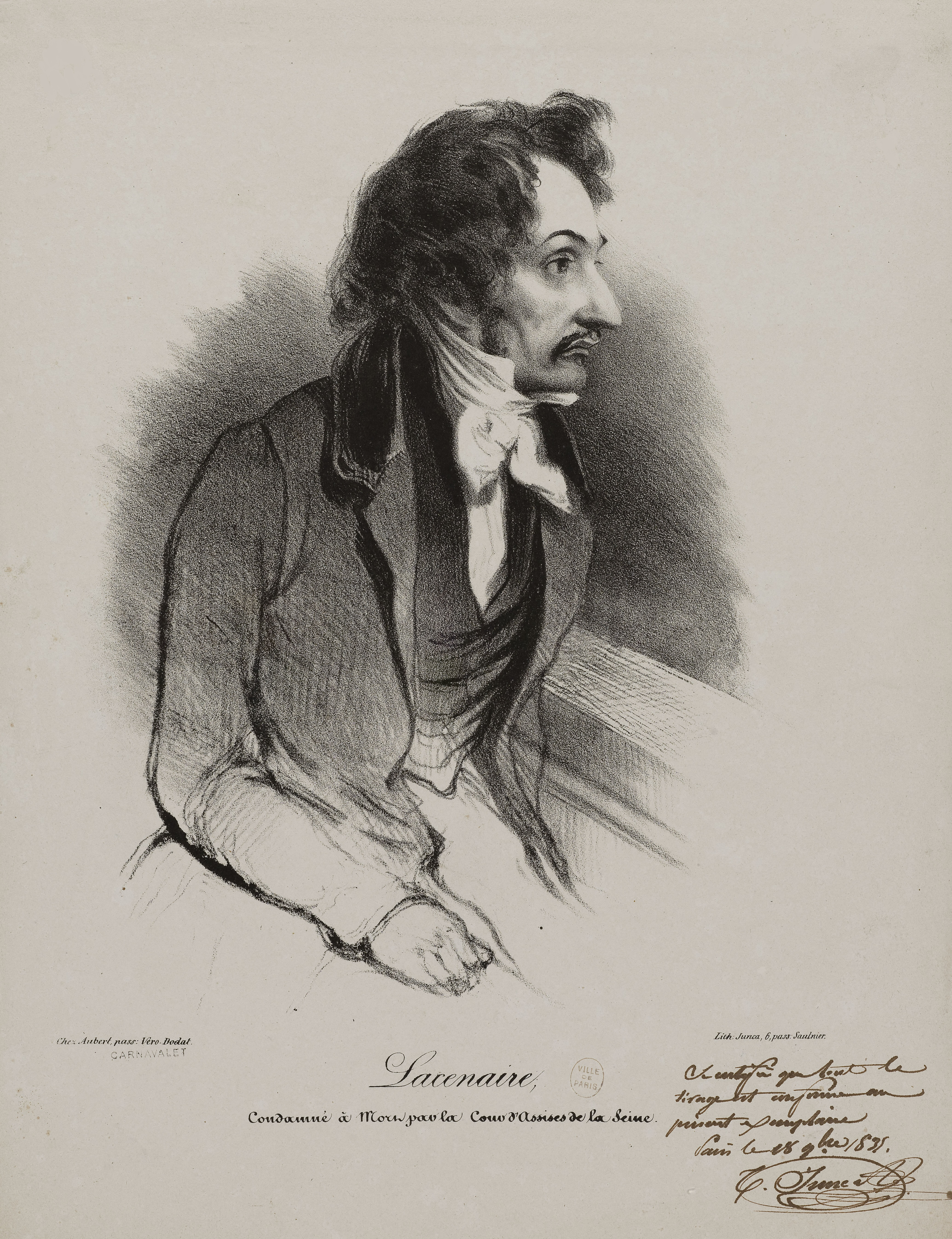
Pierre François Lacenaire

Pierre François Lacenaire (20 December 1803 – 9 January 1836) was a French murderer and poet.

== Biography ==
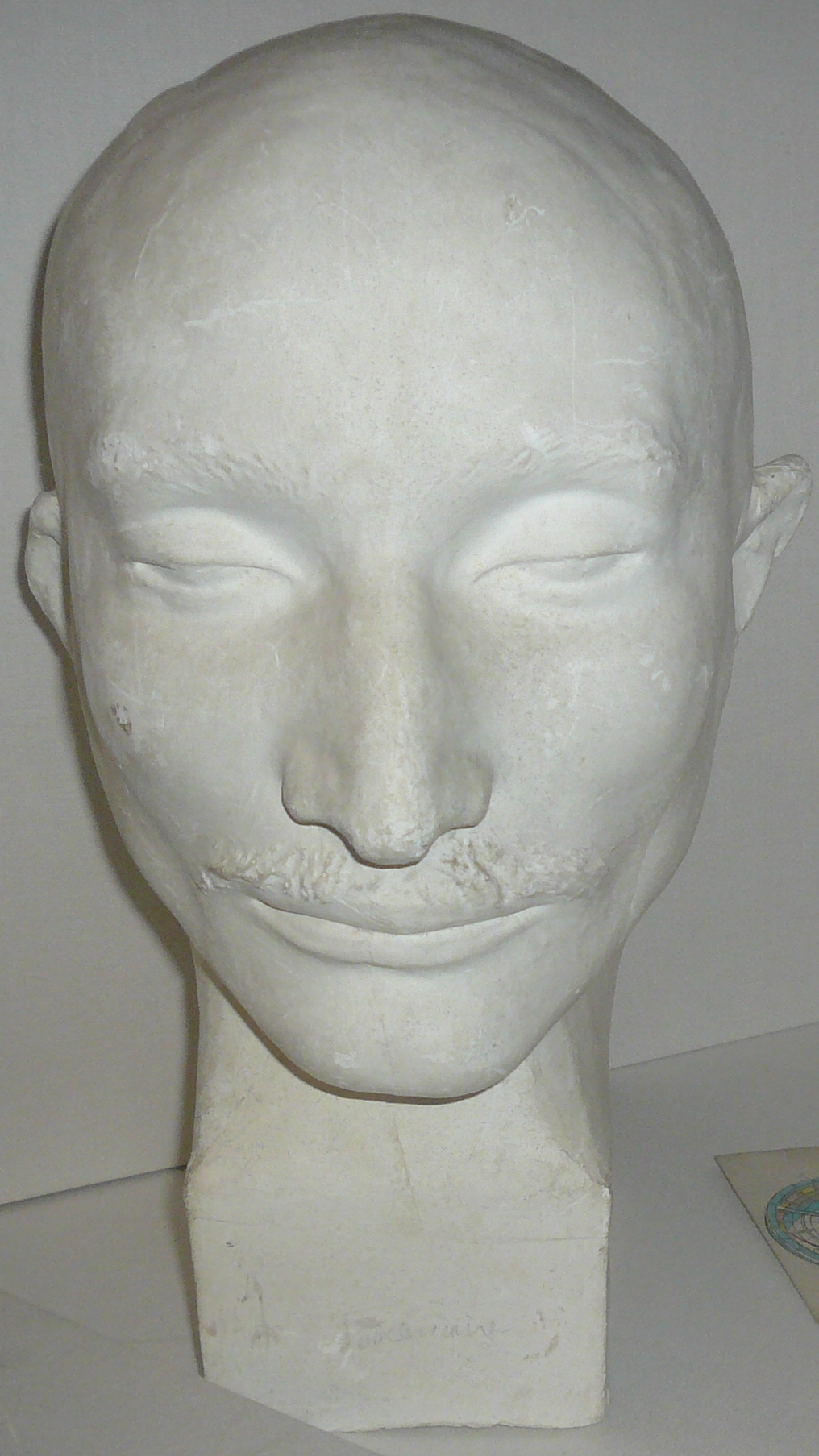
Phrenological bust of Pierre François Lacenaire, circa 1836

Lacenaire was born in Francheville, Rhône, near the city of Lyon in eastern France. His parents were Jean-Baptiste Lacenaire, an honest and successful bourgeois merchant, and Marguerite Gaillard.

Upon finishing his education with excellent results, he enlisted in the French Royal Army, eventually deserting in 1829 at the time of the Morea expedition during the Greek War of Independence. He then became a criminal and was in and out of prison, which was, as he called it, his "criminal university."

While in prison, Lacenaire wrote a satirical poem, "Petition of a Thief to a King, his Neighbor." He also wrote an article titled "The Prisons and the Penal Regime" for a magazine.

To aid him in committing his crimes, Lacenaire recruited two henchmen, Pierre Victor Avril (whom he had met while in prison) and Hippolyte François.

On 14 December 1834, Lacenaire and Avril murdered Jean-François Chardon with an axe, while suffocating Chardon's mother in her bed at Passage du Cheval-Rouge, Poissy.

In the months between the beginning of his trial for a double murder and his execution, he wrote Memoirs, Revelations and Poems. During his trial, he fiercely defended his crimes as a valid protest against social injustice. He turned the courtroom into a theatre and his prison cell into a literary salon. He made a lasting impression on French culture and upon several writers, such as Balzac and Dostoevsky.

He was executed on the guillotine at the age of 32.

== In literature and film ==
- His hand, severed after death, was the subject of a poem by Théophile Gautier.
- Dostoyevsky read about Lacenaire's case. There are some similarities between his crime and Raskolnikov's crime in Crime and Punishment. In another of his novels, The Idiot, Radomsky mentions Lacenaire when discussing Ippolit's suicide attempt with the prince Myshkin, “… But beware of those home-bred Lacenaires of ours. I repeat, crime is all too usual a refuge for mediocre, impatient, and greedy nonentities of that sort. ” In the same conversation between Radomsky and the prince 'the dozen' is referred to indicating the Lacenaire murders.
- He is depicted in the French film Children of Paradise (Les Enfants du Paradis, 1945), directed by Marcel Carné from a script by Jacques Prévert, where his stance as a loner and a rebel is stressed. In the film, Lacenaire (Marcel Herrand) refers to himself as a bold criminal and a social rebel, but his actual criminal activities mostly stay outside the film's narrative.
- Philosopher Michel Foucault believed Lacenaire's notoriety among Parisians marked the birth of a new kind of lionized outlaw (as opposed to the older folk hero), the bourgeois romantic criminal, and eventually to the detective and true crime genres of literature.
- There is a French film called Lacenaire (1990) starring Daniel Auteuil.
- The work of Enamels and Cameos is referenced in The Picture of Dorian Gray by Oscar Wilde. Wilde makes mention of two poems: "Lacenaire" and "On the Laggons". Chapter 14, Barnes and Noble edition, 2003.

== Bibliography ==
- Birmingham, Kevin. 2021. The Sinner and the Saint: Dostoevsky and the gentleman murderer who inspired a masterpiece. New York: Penguin.
- Irving, H.B. (1901). Studies of French Criminals of the Nineteenth Century. London: William Heinemann. pp. 3–48.
