= Marcel Herrand =

French actor (1897–1953)

- Born: 8 October 1897; Paris, France
- Died: 11 June 1953 (aged 55); Montfort-l'Amaury, France
- Occupation: Actor
- Years active: 1933–1952

Marcel Herrand (French pronunciation: [maʁsɛl ɛʁɑ̃]; 8 October 1897 – 11 June 1953) was a French stage and film actor best remembered for his roles in swashbuckling or historical films.

He appeared in over 25 films between 1932 and 1952, but Herrand's best remembered role is as Lacenaire (based on Pierre François Lacenaire) in Marcel Carné's Children of Paradise (Les Enfants du Paradis, 1945). Other films in which Herrand appeared include The Last Days of Pompeii (1950) and Fanfan la Tulipe (1952), which also featured Gérard Philipe and Gina Lollobrigida, in which Herrand played the role of King Louis XV.

== Selected filmography ==
- In the Service of the Tsar (1936)
- The Pavilion Burns (1941) ... Audignane
- Les Visiteurs du soir (1942) ... Baron Renaud
- The Count of Monte Cristo (1943) ... Bertuccio
- The Mysteries of Paris (1943) ... Rodolphe
- Les Enfants du paradis (1945) ... Lacenaire
- Father Serge (1945)
- Messieurs Ludovic (1946)
- Star Without Light (1946) ... Roger Marney
- The Royalists (1947) ... Corentin
- Fantômas (1947)
- Dilemma of Two Angels (1948)
- Ruy Blas (1948) ... Don Salluste
- The Mystery of the Yellow Room (1949) ... Larsan
- The Perfume of the Lady in Black (1949) ... Larsan
- The Last Days of Pompeii (1950) ... Arbax
- No Pity for Women (1950)
- One Only Loves Once (1950)
- Young Love (1951)
- Wolves Hunt at Night (1952) ... Pedro
- Fanfan la Tulipe (1952) ... King Louis XV
- The Respectful Prostitute (1952) ... Senator Clarke
