= No Pity for Women =

- Directed by: Christian Stengel
- Written by: Jean Giltène (novel); Christian Stengel
- Produced by: Aimé Frapin; Paul Wagner
- Starring: Simone Renant; Michel Auclair; Marcel Herrand
- Cinematography: René Gaveau
- Edited by: Yvonne Martin
- Music by: Paul Misraki
- Production companies: E.T.P.C.; Les Producteurs Associés
- Distributed by: Consortium du Film
- Release date: 30 August 1950
- Running time: 95 minutes
- Country: France
- Language: French

No Pity for Women (French: Pas de pitié pour les femmes) is a 1950 French mystery film directed by Christian Stengel and starring Simone Renant, Michel Auclair and Marcel Herrand. It was adapted by Jean Giltène from his own novel. The film's art direction was by Robert Hubert.

== Cast ==
- Simone Renant as Marianne Séverin
- Michel Auclair as Michel Dunan - le sosie d'Alain / Alain de Norbois - le riche disparu
- Marcel Herrand as Norbert - le majordome
- René Blancard as Me Tirgen, l'avocat
- André Versini as Adrien
- Guy Favières as Guillaume
- René Hell as Un joueur de bonneteau
- Roger Bontemps as Un inspecteur
- Paul Delon as L'inspecteur général Leroux
- Jean-Jacques Duverger as Paul de Norbois
- Robert Vattier as Adolphe Mercier - un homme d'affaires
- Jacques Castelot as Le juge d'instruction
- Geneviève Page as Carole de Norbois
- Teddy Bilis
- Nicole Gamma
- Reine Charmy
- Marcelle Arnold
- Jean Brunel
- Paule Launay
- Marcel Rouzé
- René Sauvaire

== Bibliography ==
- Rège, Philippe. Encyclopedia of French Film Directors, Volume 1. Scarecrow Press, 2009.
