= Boulevard du Crime =

19th-century nickname for the Boulevard du Temple in Paris

Coordinates: 48°51′47.84″N 2°21′59.43″E

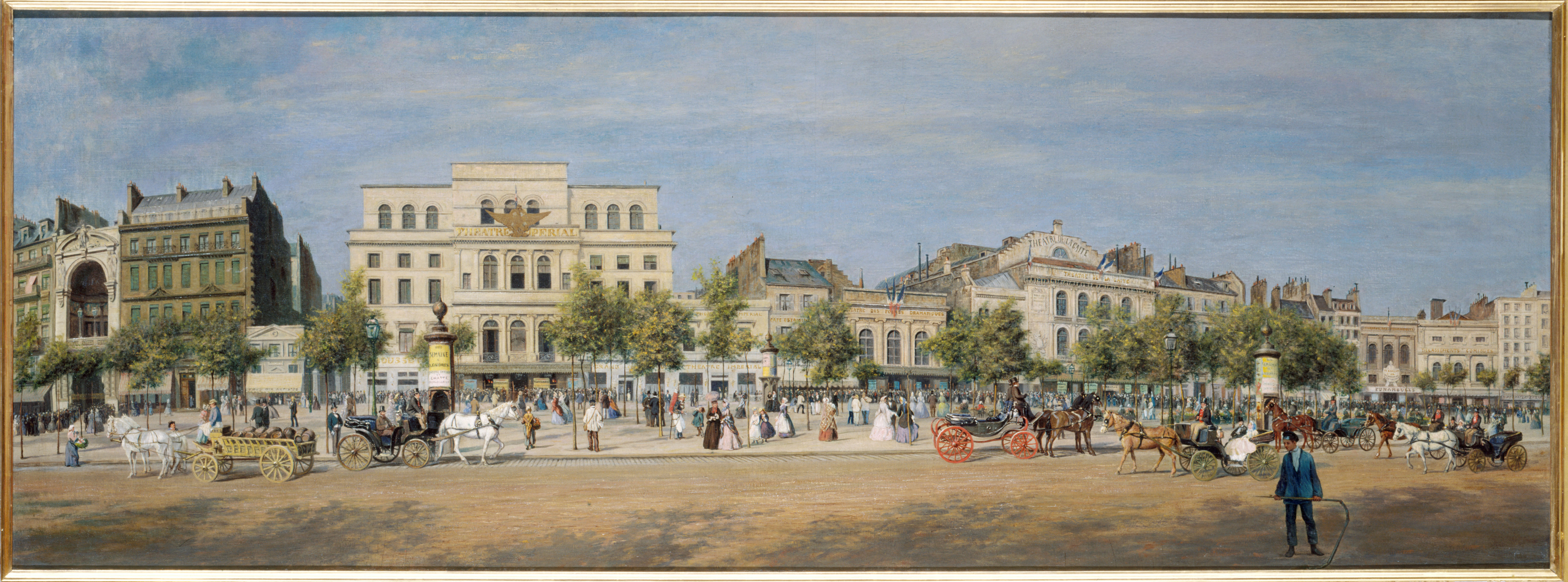
1862 painting of the Boulevard du Temple with, from left to right, the Théâtre historique, the Cirque-Olympique, the Folies dramatiques, the Théâtre de la Gaîté, the Théâtre des Funambules, the Délassements Comiques (painting by Adolphe Martial Potémont, Carnavalet Museum)

The Boulevard du Crime (French pronunciation: [bulvaʁ dy kʁim]) was the nickname given in the 19th century to the Boulevard du Temple in Paris because of the many crime melodramas that were shown every night in its many theaters. It is notorious in French history for having lost so many theatres during the rebuilding of Paris by Baron Haussmann in 1862. Of the theatres on the boulevard, only the Folies-Mayer escaped demolition during the construction of the Place de la République—solely because it was on the opposite side of the street.

In spite of the name, the "Boulevard of Crime" was not dangerous or unpleasant. In fact, it was one of the most popular places in Paris. Every night more than 20,000 people came to walk, sing, laugh and have fun.

The "Boulevard du Crime" is featured in the 1945 film Children of Paradise directed by Marcel Carné and gives its name to the first of two sections of the film.

== Theaters on Boulevard du Crime demolished in the great reorganization of 1862 ==
- the Théâtre Lyrique
- the Cirque Olympique
- the Théâtre des Folies-Dramatiques
- the Théâtre des Funambules
- the Théâtre de la Gaîté
- the Théâtre des Délassements-Comiques
- the Théâtre des Associés (renamed Theatre Patriotic under the Revolution, and Théâtre de Mme Saqui)
- the Théâtre des Pygmées
- the Petit-Lazare
- many other cabarets and cafés
