= Die Schweizer Familie =

Austrian opera

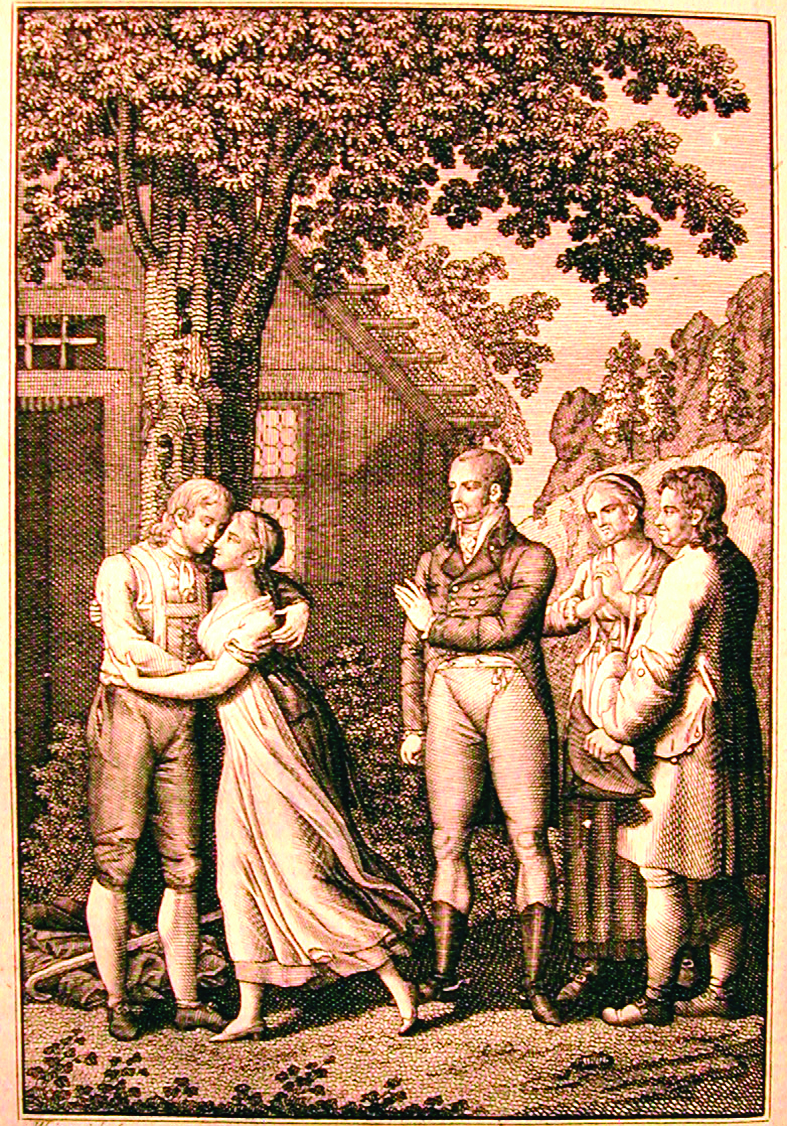
Scene design, Wiener Hoftheater-Almanach

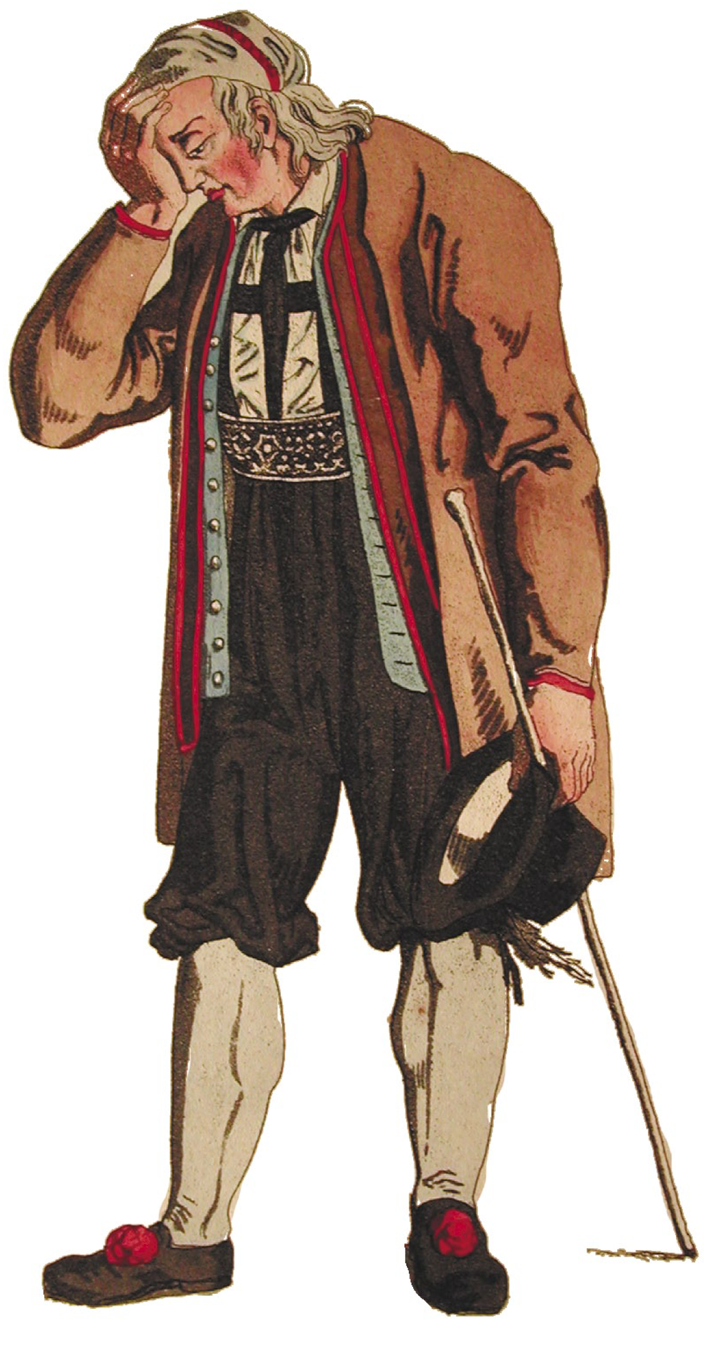
Carl Weinmüller as Richard Boll (1809)

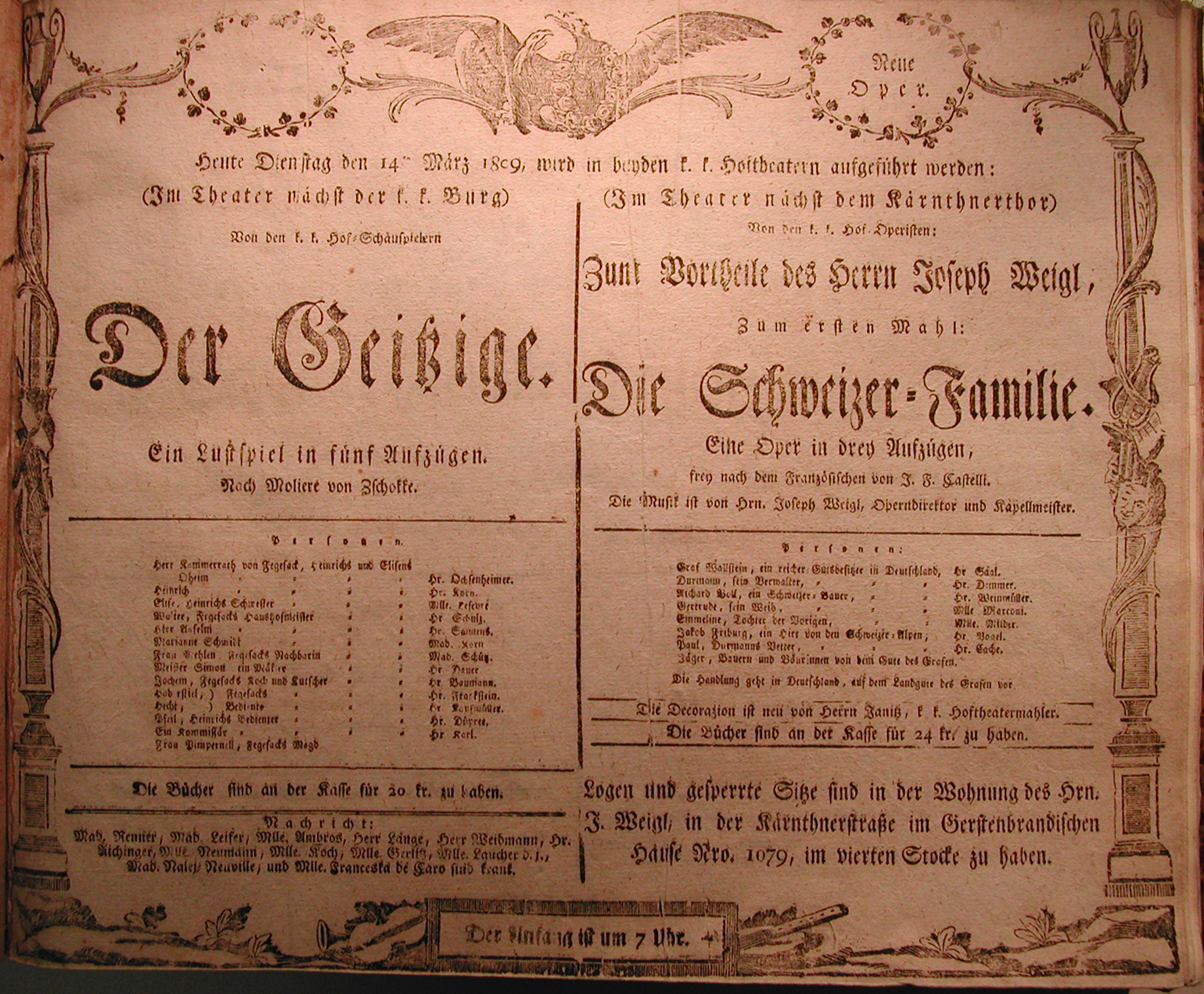
Playbill Vienna, 14 March 1809

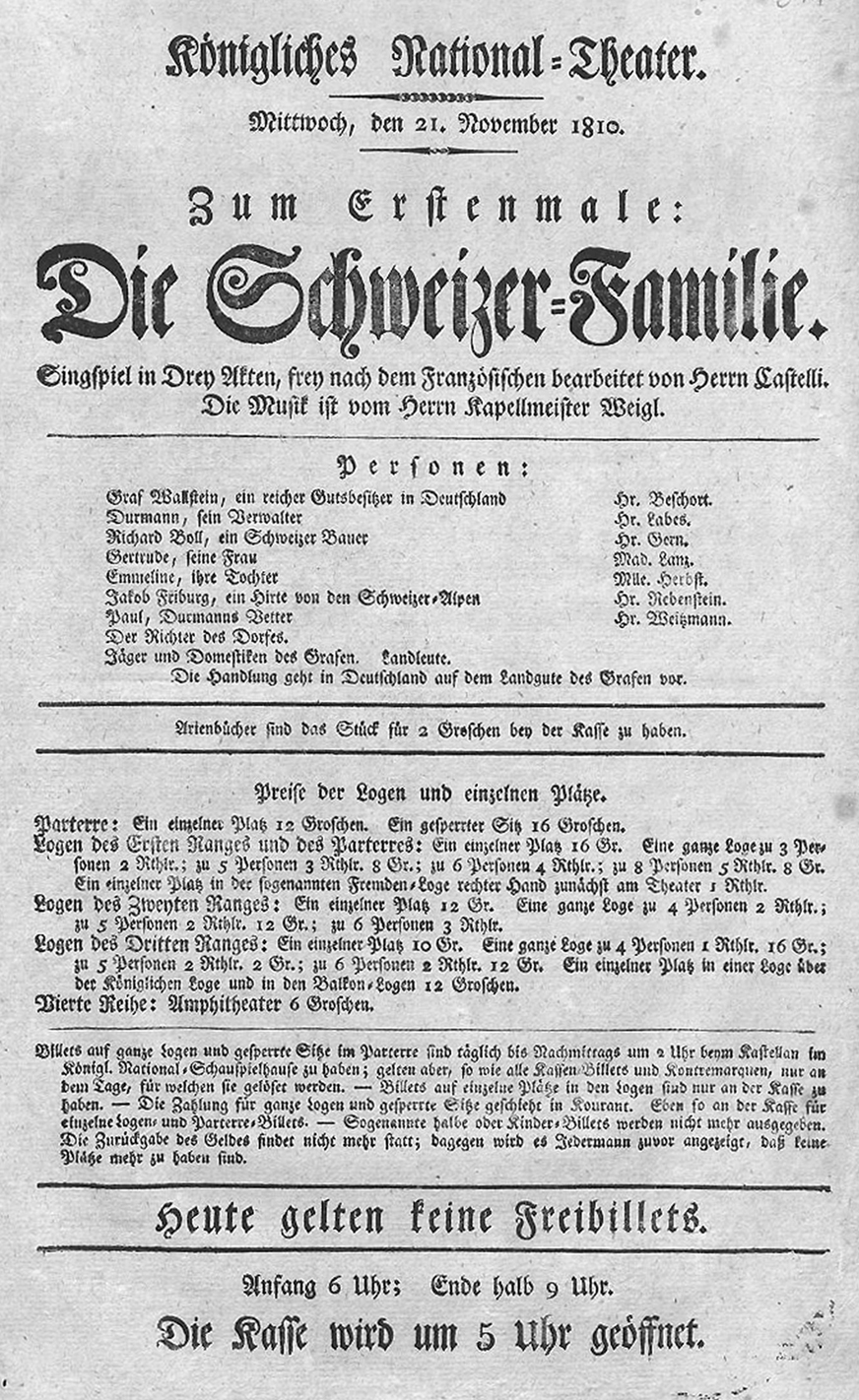
Die Schweizer-Familie (Berlin 1810)

Die Schweizer Familie (The Swiss Family) is an opera by the Austrian composer Joseph Weigl. It takes the form of a Singspiel in three acts. The libretto, by Ignaz Franz Castelli, is based on the vaudeville Pauvre Jacques (1807) by Charles-Augustin de Basson-Pierre, known as Sewrin, and René de Chazet. The opera was first performed at the Theater am Kärntnertor, conducted by the composer, in Vienna on 14 March 1809 and was a great success in German-speaking countries in the early 19th century.

== Roles ==
Roles, voice types, premiere cast
Cast	Voice type	Premiere cast, 14 March 1809
Gertrude Boll	soprano	Marianna Marconi
Richard Boll	bass	Carl Weinmüller
Emmeline, the Bolls' daughter	soprano	Anna Milder-Hauptmann
Jacob Friburg, in love with Emmeline	tenor	Johann Michael Vogl
Count Wallstein	bass	Ignaz Saal
Paul	tenor	Joseph Caché
Durmann	tenor	Friedrich Demmer

== Synopsis ==
The Bolls, the Swiss family of the title, have been banished to an unspecified region in the Alps. Their daughter, Emmeline, pines for the love of Jakob, to whom she is secretly engaged. The local count, whose life was saved by Richard Boll, also shows concern for Emmeline's sufferings and with his help Emmeline and Jakob are reunited.

== Recording ==
- Die Schweizer Familie Soloists, Chorus and Orchestra Dreieck, conducted by Uri Rom (Guild, 2006)

== Legacy ==
Ignaz Moscheles wrote a set of 12 variations for piano (Op. 5) on the air "Wer hörte wohl jemals mich klagen".
