= Bondra =

Bondra is a surname. Notable people with the surname include:

- Anna Bondra (1798–1836), Austrian operatic soprano and mezzo-soprano
- Dávid Bondra (born 1992), American-born Slovak ice hockey player, son of Peter
- Peter Bondra (born 1968), Soviet-born Slovak ice hockey player
