= Angrisani =

Angrisani is an Italian surname. Notable people with the surname include:

- Al Angrisani (1949–2020), American businessman and writer
- Carlo Angrisani (c. 1760–?), Italian opera singer
- Giovanni Antonio Angrisani (1560–1641), Italian Roman Catholic prelate
