= Falstaff (Salieri) =

Opera by Antonio Salieri

- Dramma giocoso by Antonio Salieri
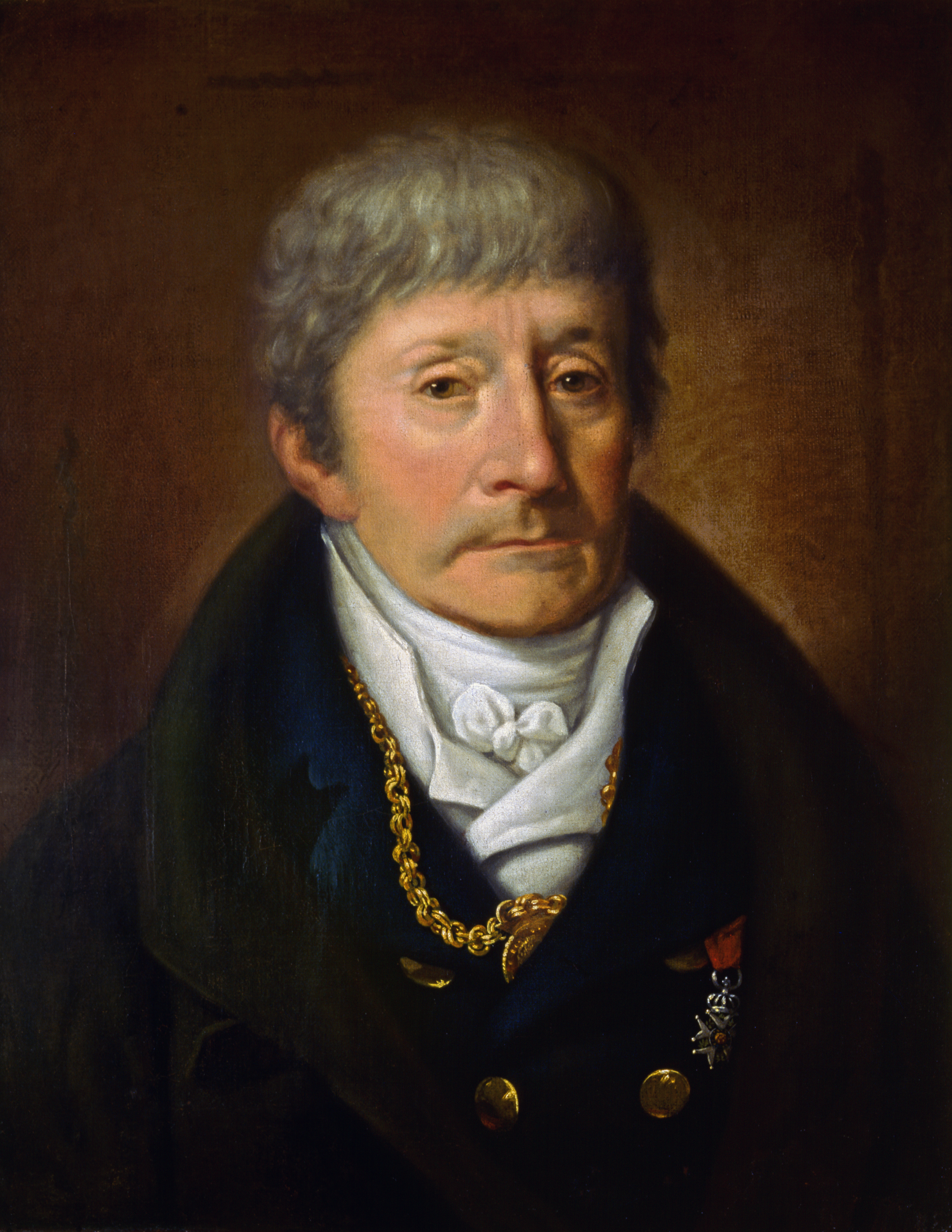
- Antonio Salieri, portrait by Joseph Willibrord Mähler, 1815
- Translation: Falstaff, or The Three Jokes
- Librettist: Carlo Prospero Defranceschi
- Language: Italian
- Based on: The Merry Wives of Windsor by Shakespeare
- Premiere: 3 January 1799; Kärntnertortheater, Vienna

Falstaff, ossia Le tre burle (Falstaff, or The Three Jokes) is a dramma giocoso in two acts by Antonio Salieri, set to a libretto by Carlo Prospero Defranceschi after William Shakespeare's The Merry Wives of Windsor.

One of the earliest operatic versions of Shakespeare's play, Salieri's Falstaff is notable for a general compression and streamlining of the original plot, note the absence of the two young lovers, Fenton and Anne, and the addition of a scene in which Mistress Ford pretends to be German to charm Falstaff (actually two such scenes exist, one in a separate score by Salieri was probably omitted from the original Viennese productions). Defranceschi moves the plot and structure away from Elizabethan drama and closer to the standard conventions of late 18th century opera buffa.

Highlights include the Sinfonia (overture) in the style of contra dances. The entire opera shows the influence of Mozart's Le nozze di Figaro, which was being successfully revived at the time. Among the musical highlights, besides the sinfonia, are Falstaff's strutting Act I patter aria, the quartet in Act I, the duettino "La stessa, La stessissima", the technically brilliant "laughter" trio in the opening moments of Act II, the canonical duet of Mr. and Mrs. Ford toward the end of Act II (featuring a rare late 18th century cello solo) and the grand finale to Act II. Throughout the score Salieri employs careful tone painting, parody of opera seria conventions, a more harmonically interesting structure for the secco recitative, and more involved counterpoint; traits that have helped return Falstaff to the playing boards.

== Performance history ==
It was first performed at the Kärntnertortheater in Vienna on 3 January 1799. Twenty-six performances were given between then and 1802.

The American premiere took place in 1972 at the Philadelphia Musical Academy with David Agler conducting. The Boston premiere was given by Associate Artists Opera on 15 November 1974 in the National Theater of the Boston Center for the Arts with David Arnold in the title role, supported by Elizabeth Phinney, Pamela Gore, Frank Hoffmeister and Ernest Triplett, conducted by Robert Willoughby Jones, with an English translation by Michael Auclair (who also directed the production) and scenery by William Fregosi. Bampton Classical Opera performed it in 2004.

Chicago Opera Theater gave the premiere in that city in December 2025, staged by Robin Guarino and conducted by Christine Brandes.

== Roles ==
Cast	Voice type	Premiere, January 3, 1799 (Conductor: - )
Sir John Falstaff	bass	Carlo Angrisani
Master Ford	tenor	Giuseppe Simoni
Mistress Ford	soprano	Irene Tomeoni
Master Slender	baritone	Ignaz Saal
Mistress Slender	soprano	Louise Milloch
Bardolf, Falstaff's servant	baritone	Gaetano Lotti
Betty, Mistress Ford's maid	soprano	Marianne Gaßmann

== Arrangements ==
Beethoven used the duet La stessa, La stessissima for a series of variations, WoO 73.

== Discography ==
- Romano Franceschetto, Fernando Luis Ciuffo, Filippo Bettoschi, Milan Madrigalists, Chiara Chialli, et al. Alberto Veronesi cond, Guido Cantelli Orchestra Milan. 2 CDs, DDD, Chandos, 17 March 1998
- Simon Edwards, Salomé Haller, Liliana Faraon, Raimonds Spogis, Hjördis Thébault, et al. Jean-Claude Malgoire cond., La Grande Écurie et la Chambre du Roy, Chantres de la Chapelle de Versailles. 2 CDs, DDD, Dynamic, 3 March 2003
- József Gregor, Mária Zempléni, Dénes Gulyás, Istvan Gáti, Eva Pánczél, et al. Tamás Pál cond., Salieri Chamber Orchestra, Salieri Chamber Chorus. 3 CDs, DDD, Hungaroton, 27 September 2003
- John Del Carlo, Teresa Ringholz, Richard Croft, Delores Ziegler, Jake Gardner, et al. Claus Viller, Agnes Meth dir., Arnold Östmann cond., Radio Symphony Orchestra Stuttgart. DVD, 120 mins, Arthaus Musik, 31 July 2000
