= L'amor coniugale =

Opera by Simon Mayr

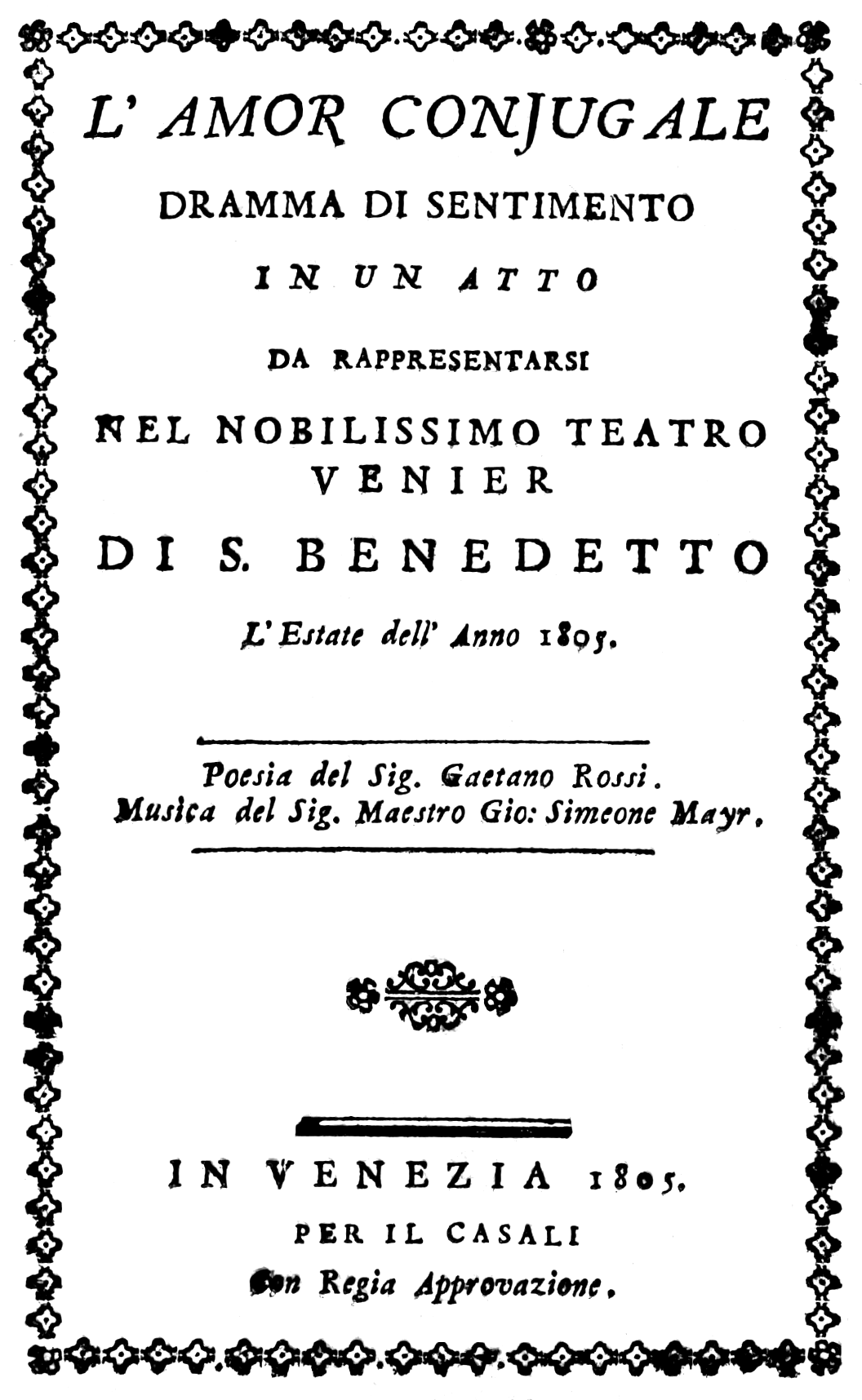
Libretto title page, 1805

L'amor coniugale (Conjugal Love) is an opera in one act by Simon Mayr set to an Italian libretto by Gaetano Rossi. It premiered at Padua's Teatro Nuovo on 26 July 1805.

== Background and performance history ==
Like Beethoven's Fidelio, the libretto of L'amor coniugale is based on Jean-Nicolas Bouilly's French libretto for Pierre Gaveaux's 1798 opera Léonore, ou L'amour conjugal. Unlike Fidelio which focuses on the struggle for political liberty, Mayr's opera, also known as Il custode di buon cuore (The Good-hearted Jailer) and described in its libretto as a farsa sentimentale, focuses more on the interpersonal relationships between the protagonists and contains comic elements. Rossi condensed Bouilly's two-act libretto into one act containing 19 scenes and changed the setting from the Napoleonic Wars to 17th century Poland.

L'amor coniugale premiered at the Teatro Nuovo in Padua on 26 July 1805 in a double bill with the premiere of Pietro Carlo Guglielmi's La donna di spirito. It was then performed the following September at the Teatro San Benedetto in Venice. Although rarely performed now, it was revived at the Teatro Donizetti in Bergamo in November 1984 conducted by Bruno Moretti and in Germany at the 2004 Rossini in Wildbad Festival conducted by Christopher Franklin. The Wildbad performance used a revised score by Arrigo Gazzaniga and was issued by the Naxos Records label.

== Roles ==
Roles, voice types, premiere cast
Role	Voice type	Premiere cast 26 July 1805
Zeliska, in disguise, Malvino	soprano	Margherita Chabrand
Amorveno, Zeliska's imprisoned husband	tenor	Savino Monelli (Note: Casaglia gives Saverio Monelli.)
Peters, the jailer	bass	Carlo Angrisani
Floreska, Peters' daughter	soprano	Clementina Veglia
Moroski, the governor	bass	Natale Veglia
Ardelao, Amorveno's brother	tenor	Carlo Merusi

== Recordings ==
- Mayr: L'amor coniugale – live recording from the 2004 Rossini festival in Wildbad, Germany, with Christopher Franklin conducting the Württemberg Philharmonic Orchestra. Label: Naxos Records 8660198
- Mayr: L'Amor Conjugale – recorded at the opéra de Massy, France, 2021, with David Stern conducting Opera Fuoco. Label: Aparté AP267
