= Julius Radichi =

Austrian actor

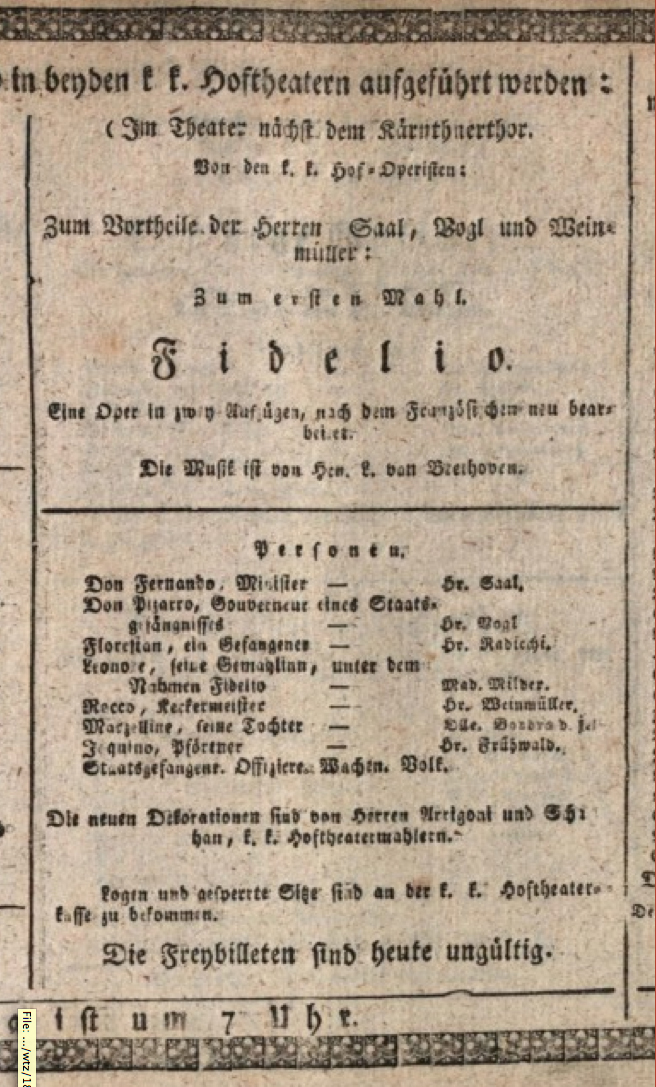
Posting slips for the premiere of the third version of Fidelio on 23 March 1814

Julius Radichi (1763 – 16 September 1846) was an actor and operatic tenor from the Austrian Empire.

== Life ==
Radichi probably came from Italy and first appeared in Milan's la Scala in 1793/94 and in Genoa in 1799. From 24 February 1808 to 31 August 1819 and from 1826 to 1829 he was a member of the Vienna Court Theatres. On 23 March 1829 he gave his farewell concert and was afterwards active as a pedagogue.

He was also an esteemed concert singer, especially in Haydn's oratorios The Creation and The Seasons.

He became particularly famous in the role of Florestan in Beethoven's Fidelio. He impersonated this part in the premiere of the third and final version, which took place on 23 March 1814 at the Theater am Kärntnertor. Previously he had also sung Florestan in Paër's Leonore, which was first performed on 8 February 1809 at the Theater am Kärntnertor in German.

Radichi last lived at Franziskanerplatz No. 911 in Vienna, where he died of old age at the age of 83.
