= Hugo Siegmüller =

Czech painter

- Born: 30 October 1889; Česká Kamenice, Austria-Hungary
- Died: 24 June 1958 (aged 68); Mühlhausen, Germany
- Occupation: Painter

Hugo Siegmüller (30 October 1889 – 24 June 1958) was a Sudeten German painter. His work, representing Czechoslovakia, was part of the painting event in the art competition at the 1932 Summer Olympics and the art competition of the 1936 Summer Olympics.
