= Louise Müller =

German opera singer

Louise Karolina Müller, née Ludovika Müller (1784 – after 1837) was an actress and operatic soprano. She appeared mostly in soubrette roles, but is known for performing as Marzelline at the premiere of Beethoven's Fidelio on 20 November 1805.

== Life ==
Born in Frankfurt, Müller was the daughter of the famous actress Ludovica Müller née Spieß (1763–1837).

She made her debut on 10 July 1798 at the Vienna Theater am Kärntnertor as "Bärbchen" (Barbarina) in the German-language premiere of Mozart's opera Le nozze di Figaro. The following year she impersonated "child roles" there, while her mother sang "tender roles". This information suggests that she was born around 1784.

Together with her mother she then went to the Theater an der Wien in the spring of 1803, where she took part in the premiere of Beethoven's oratorio Christus am Ölberge op. 85 on 5 April 1803. In the same concert Beethoven premiered his Symphony No. 2 Op. 36 and Piano Concerto No. 3 Op. 37.

Her mother made her debut at the Theater an der Wien on 4 June 1803 as Cora in the tragedy Die Spanier in Peru oder Rollas Tod by August von Kotzebue. Louise Müller first appeared on 15 June 1803 as Caroline ("Blumenmädchen auf der Insel") in the musical play Die Insel der Liebe by Vicente Martín y Soler in the German translation by Matthäus Stegmayer. The placard contains the note: "Demoiselle Müller, a new member of this society, will have the honour for the first time today to appear in the above role. In the following years she played numerous soubretten parts there, for example in Antonio Salieri's Singspiel Die Neger, which premiered on 10 November 1804.

On 7 April 1805 she appeared in the Theater an der Wien in a concert of the violinist Franz Clement with an aria by Sebastiano Nasolini. The Viennese correspondent of the Leipzig Allgemeine Musikalische Zeitung wrote about it: she had meanwhile "formed into a tasteful, quite good singer, if she wasn't supported by a very excellent voice at once". In the same concert Beethoven conducted his Symphony Nr. 3 op. 55, the Eroica.

Ihre bekannteste Rolle war die Marzelline in Beethoven's Fidelio, die sie sowohl bei der Uraufführung der ersten Fassung am 20 November 1805 als auch bei der Uraufführung der zweiten Fassung am 29 März 1806 verkörperte. Bemerkenswert ist, dass sie am 26. März 1806, bei einer privaten Aufführung von Paër's opera Leonora im Palais des Fürsten Joseph Lobkowitz, die Titelpartie übernahm. Dies ist einer Tagebuchnotiz des Grafen Karl von Zinzendorf zu entnehmen, der sie zugleich als Geliebte des russischen Fürsten Peter Iwanowitsch Tufiakin (1769–1845) bezeichnet.

The writer Ignaz Franz Castelli frequently visited her around 1807 and reported: "A good actress and singer was at that time at the Theater an der Wien; Fräulein Müller, as a soubrette she was excellent. I had access to the house, and the lady's mother, who played mothers in acting, but badly, often invited me to dinner and gave me sweet looks; only I was a chaste Joseph, because Madame Müller was not as charming as Putiphar, and therefore never left my coat there. The daughter would probably have been my own choice, and I also worked on a French comedy for her, which was given under her name under the title "Das Liebhabertheater," but it did not bear me any fruit, since she had a love affair with a Russian prince.

The aforementioned play Das Liebhabertheater - the translation of a play by Emmanuel Dupaty - premiered on 22 April 1807. Louise Müller was actually named as the author. In the review of the Wiener Theater-Zeitung it said:

"The popular Louise Müller, an experienced actress and beautiful singer, also tried to preserve the love of the public as a poet. She succeeded... Demoiselle Müller delighted me with her bright singing: "I was, when I woke up" etc. from Das unterbrochene Opferfest by Peter von Winter, she played the role with gentle grace, and was recalled at the end, for which she thanked modestly and appropriately, and asked the author to forgive the merits of the play, after she had worked on it, the mistakes, which she, however, made as a translator.

Castelli wrote about her artistic abilities:

"A lovely actress and good singer was Fräulein Müller, especially in the cheerful field. She knew how to equip her soubrette roles with a decency that she took everything for herself, but also in more serious roles she knew how to fill her place with honours."

One of her great successes was Marianne in Soliman II. by Franz Xaver Süßmayr, which she sang for the first time on 5 September 1807 at the premiere of the new production of the opera in the Theater an der Wien. In an overview of the present state of musical art in Vienna it says 1808 about Louise Müller:

"Mlle Müller, also from the Wienertheater, knew how to give her initially insecure voice several attitudes through praiseworthy diligence. She sings with ease, and would also sing with taste, if she did not sometimes let herself be carried away by the prevailing rage of ornamentation.

On 31 May 1808 she left Vienna and met with Prince Tufiakin in Munich on 3 June. Subsequently she worked for several years at the Imperial German Court Theatre in St. Petersburg.

As the Wiener Theater-Zeitung reported, "Demoiselle Louise Müller" then appeared on 9 January 1816 "after a seven-year absence for the first time, and made her debut in the role of Marianne, which she played here in 1807 when the opera was given on 5 September for the first time at the Theater an der Wien, with general applause.“ The Viennese correspondent of the Allgemeine Musikalische Zeitung writes about the same performance that her voice had "suffered a lot, and has almost disappeared". On 31 March 1817 she gave her farewell performance.

In Russia she is said to have married a musician named Bender, which, however, is not mentioned in contemporary theatre and music journals. According to this she appeared at least in Vienna under her maiden name until the end.

From April 1817 to November 1827 and from January 1831 to January 1834 she was allegedly engaged again in the German theatre in Petersburg.

== Ludovica Müller-Spieß ==
The mother Ludovica Müller-Spieß, who is partly confused in literature with her daughter, was born around 1763 in Wetzlar. She worked at the Theater an der Wien until 1806 and later at the Theater in der Leopoldstadt. At last she lived "in the Leopoldstadt No. 122", where she died of gout on 6 July 1837 at the age of 74. The death entry describes her as "actress and benefactor of A. Svitavy, born in Wetzlar".
