= Johann Michael Weinkopf =

Austrian operatic bass (1780–1862)

Johann Michael Weinkopf (15 September 1780 – 8 March 1862) was an Austrian operatic bass and actor.

== Life ==
Born in Kirchberg am Walde, Weinkopf first belonged to the ensemble of the Theater an der Wien and appeared in the role of Minister Don Fernando at the premiere of Beethoven's Fidelio on 20 November 1805, as well as at the two performances of the second version of the opera on 29 March and 10 April 1806.

From 15 June 1807 to 1809 and from 1814 to 30 November 1821 he was a member of the Vienna Court Opera.

In later years Weinkopf was choir master of the choir boys at the court opera house, singer at St. Stephen's Cathedral and chapel master at the court parish church of Saint Michael.

Around 1835 he directed a music conservatory (Musik- und Singlehranstalt) in the small Michaelerhaus (today Michaelerplatz 6).

Weinkopf died in Vienna at age 81.
