= Joseph Rothe =

Austrian opera singer

Joseph Rothe (1759 – 18 March 1808) was an Austrian operatic bass singer.

== Life ==
Born in Česká Kamenice, from 1785 to 1787 Rothe worked at the Viennese court theatres and from 1792 to 1803 he was the tenant of the theatre in Brno.

Afterwards he moved to the Theater an der Wien. There he sang the role of the jailer Rocco at the premiere of Beethoven's Fidelio on 20 November 1805, as well as at the two performances of the second version of the opera on 29 March and 10 April 1806.

He lived last in Vienna, where he died on 18 March 1808 at the age of only 49 years.

Rothe was married to the singer Clara Rothe (1763-1826), who belonged to the ensemble of the court theatres from 1785 to 1793, then worked in Brno as well as in the Theater an der Wien.
