= Jean-Nicolas Bouilly =

French playwright, librettist, children's writer, and politician (1763–1842)

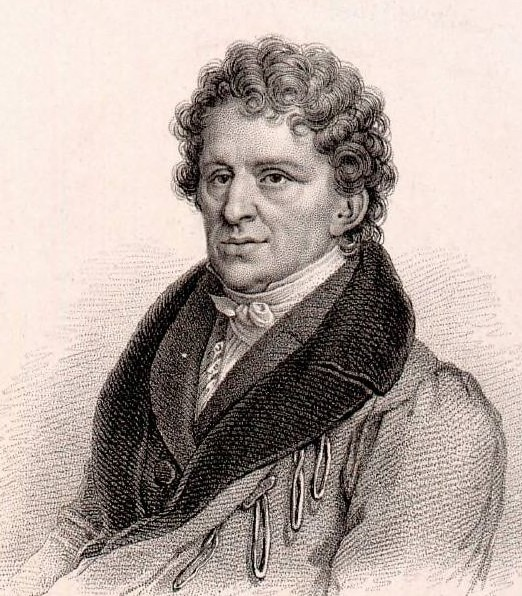
- Born: 24 January 1763; Joué-lès-Tours
- Died: 14 April 1842 (aged 79); Paris
- Occupations: Playwright; Librettist; Writer

Jean-Nicolas Bouilly (24 January 1763 – 14 April 1842) was a French playwright, librettist, children's writer, and politician of the French Revolution. He is best known for writing a libretto, supposedly based on a true story, about a woman who disguises herself as a man to rescue her husband from prison, which formed the basis of Beethoven's opera Fidelio as well as a number of other operas.

== Life ==
Bouilly was born near Tours, and was briefly a lawyer for the Parlement of Paris. At the outbreak of the Revolution he held office under the new government and was head of the military commission in Tours during the Reign of Terror.

In 1795, he served as a member of the Committee of Public Instruction having a considerable share in the organization of primary education, but retired from public life four years later in order to devote himself to literature. Bouilly died in Paris.

== Works ==
Theatre

- 1790: Pierre le Grand, comedy in 4 acts and in prose, mingled with singing, music by André Grétry, Comédie Italienne, 13 January
- 1790: Jean-Jacques Rousseau à ses derniers moments, historical trait in 1 act and in prose, Comédie Italienne, 31 December read online
- 1798: Léonore, ou L'amour conjugal, historical fact in 2 acts and in prose mingled with songs, music by Pierre Gaveaux, created at the Théâtre Feydeau 19 February Read online The play formed the basis for the libretto which Ludwig van Beethoven used for the opera Fidelio; it was also set by Pierre Gaveaux as Léonore, ou L’amour conjugal (1798), by Ferdinando Paer as Leonora (1804), and by Simon Mayr as L'amor coniugale (1805).
- 1797: La Mort de Turenne, historical and military play with extravaganza, in 3 acts, mingled with pantomimes, fights and evolutions, with Jean-Guillaume-Antoine Cuvelier, Théâtre de la Cité, 11 June
- 1796: René Descartes, historical trait in 2 acts and in prose, Théâtre-Français, 20 September Read online
- 1796: La Famille américaine, comedy in 1 act and in prose, mingled with songs, music by Nicolas Dalayrac, Comédie Italienne, 17 February
- 1799: Le Tombeau de Turenne, ou l'Armée du Rhin à Saspach, historical fact in 1 act, mingled with vaudevilles, pantomimes, dances and military evolutions, with Jean-Guillaume-Antoine Cuvelier and Hector Chaussier, Palais des Variétés, 8 January
- 1799: L'Abbé de L'Épée, historical comedy in 5 acts and in prose, Théâtre-Français, 14 December Read online
- 1800: Les Deux Journées, comédie lyrique in 3 acts, music by Luigi Cherubini, Théâtre of the Opéra-Comique, 15 January
- 1800: Zoé, ou la Pauvre Petite, opera in 1 act, music by Charles-Henri Plantade, Théâtre de l'Opéra-Comique, 3 July
- 1800: Téniers, comedy in 1 act and in prose, mingled with vaudevilles, with Joseph Pain, Théâtre du Vaudeville, 18 October
- 1800: Florian, comedy in 1 act, in prose, mingled with vaudevilles, with Joseph-Marie Pain, Théâtre du Vaudeville, 18 December
- 1801: Berquin, ou l'Ami des enfants, comedy in 1 act, on prose, mingled with vaudevilles, with Joseph-Marie Pain, Théâtre du Vaudeville, 7 December Read online
- 1802: Une Folie, comedy in 2 acts, mingled with songs, music by Étienne-Nicolas Méhul, Théâtre de l'Opéra-Comique, 4 April
- 1803: Fanchon la vielleuse, comedy in 3 acts, mingled with vaudevilles, with Joseph-Marie Pain, Théâtre du Vaudeville, 16 January Read online
- 1803: Héléna, opera in 3 acts, music by Étienne-Nicolas Méhul, Théâtre de l'Opéra-Comique, 1 March
- 1804: Le Désastre de Lisbonne, heroical drama in 3 acts, in prose, mingled with dance and pantomime, music by Alexandre Piccini, Théâtre de la Porte-Saint-Martin, 24 November Read online
- 1805: L'Intrigue aux fenêtres, opera bouffon in 1 act, with Emmanuel Dupaty, music by Nicolas Isouard, Théâtre de l'Opéra-Comique, 25 February Read online
- 1805: Madame de Sévigné, comedy in 3 acts and in prose, Théâtre-Français, 6 June Read online
- 1806: Les Français dans le Tyrol, historical fact, in 1 act and in prose, Théâtre-Français, 1 February
- 1806: Agnès Sorel, comedy in 3 acts mingled with vaudevilles, with Emmanuel Dupaty, Théâtre du Vaudeville, 9 April
- 1808: Haine aux femmes, comedy in 1 act, mingled with vaudevilles, Théâtre du Vaudeville, 23 February
- 1809: Françoise de Foix, opera comique in 3 acts, with Emmanuel Dupaty, music by Henri Montan Berton, Théâtre de l'Opéra-Comique, 28 January
- 1809: Le Petit courrier, ou Commé les femmes se vengent, comedy in 2 acts, in prose, mingled with vaudevilles, with Charles-François-Jean-Baptiste Moreau de Commagny, Théâtre du Vaudeville, 20 April
- 1810: La Vieillesse de Piron, comedy in 1 act, in prose, mingled with vaudevilles, with Joseph-Marie Pain, Théâtre du Vaudeville, 9 April
- 1811: La Belle au bois dormant, féerie-vaudeville in 2 acts, with Théophile Marion Dumersan, Théâtre du Vaudeville, 20 February
- 1812: Robert le diable, comedy in 2 acts, mingled with vaudevilles, with Théophile Marion Dumersan, Théâtre du Vaudeville, 31 December
- 1813: Le Séjour militaire, opera comique in 1 act, music by Auber, Théâtre de l'Opéra-Comique, 27 February
- 1817: Le Prince en goguette, ou la Faute et la leçon, comedy in 2 acts and in prose, mingled with couplets, music by Marc-Antoine Désaugiers, Théâtre du Vaudeville, 21 April
- 1818: Les Jeux floraux, opera in 3 acts, music by Léopold Aimon, Académie royale de musique, 16 November
- 1822: Valentine de Milan, drame lyrique in 3 acts, posthumous music by Étienne-Nicolas Méhul, score completed by Joseph Daussoigne, Théâtre de l'Opéra-Comique, 28 November
- 1829: Les Deux Nuits, opera comique in 3 acts, with Eugène Scribe, music by François Adrien Boieldieu, Théâtre de l'Opéra-Comique, 20 May
- 1832: Le Bandeau, comédie en vaudeville in 1 act, with Louis-Émile Vanderburch, Théâtre du Gymnase-Dramatique, 21 May
- 1833: Guido Reni, ou les Artistes, drama in 5 acts, with Antony Béraud, Comédie-Française, 6 February

Tales

- 1807: Causeries d'un vieillard,
- 1819: Contes à ma fille,
- 1811: Conseils à ma fille Read online
- 1817: Les Jeunes Femmes, 2 vol.
- 1817: Annales de la jeunesse, with M. et M^{me} Hyacinthe Azaïs, by Rougemont and Lefebvre,
- 1817: Les Encouragements de la jeunesse read online
- 1823: Les Mères de famille, 2 vol.
- 1824–1825: Contes offerts aux enfants de France, 2 vol.,
- 1827: Contes à mes petites amies, ou Trois Mois en Touraine, 1827 Texte en ligne
- 1829–1831 Le Portefeuille de la jeunesse, ou la Morale et l'histoire enseignées par des exemples, précédé d'un discours sur l'ensemble de l'ouvrage, 20 vol.,
- 1830: Contes populaires, read online
- 1835: Les Adieux du vieux conteur,
- 1836: Alfred et Nathalie, ou les Coupables supposés,
- 1838: Nouvelles Causeries d'un vieillard,
- 1846: La Discrétion,
- 1846: Petits Contes d'une mère à ses enfants,
- 1877: Nouveaux conseils à ma fille, Read online
- 1883: Contes moraux pour les jeunes élèves, read on line
- 1884: Geneviève et Marcelin, ou les Jumeaux de la Beauce. La Charrette à bras, Read online
- 1884: Le Dévouement filial, ou la Chanteuse volée, Read online
- 1885: La Petite Gouvernante, suivie d'autres épisodes, Read online
- 1886: Causeries pour la jeunesse, read online
- 1886: Causeries et nouvelles causeries, Read online

Varia

- 1836–1837: Mes Récapitulations, 3 vol.,
- 1837: Explication des douze écussons qui représentent les emblèmes et les symboles des douze grades philosophiques du rite écossais dit ancien et accepté, par l'ill.* F.* Bouilly,
- 1838: Nouvelles Récapitulations,
- 1842: Soixante ans du Théâtre-Français, par un amateur, né en 1769,
- undated: Le Vieux Glaneur, ou de Tout un peu, poems.

In 1836 he published an autobiography.

== Quote ==
- "Whatever we possess becomes of double value when we have the opportunity of sharing it with others."
