= Jan Papajanovský =

Czech politician (born 1994)

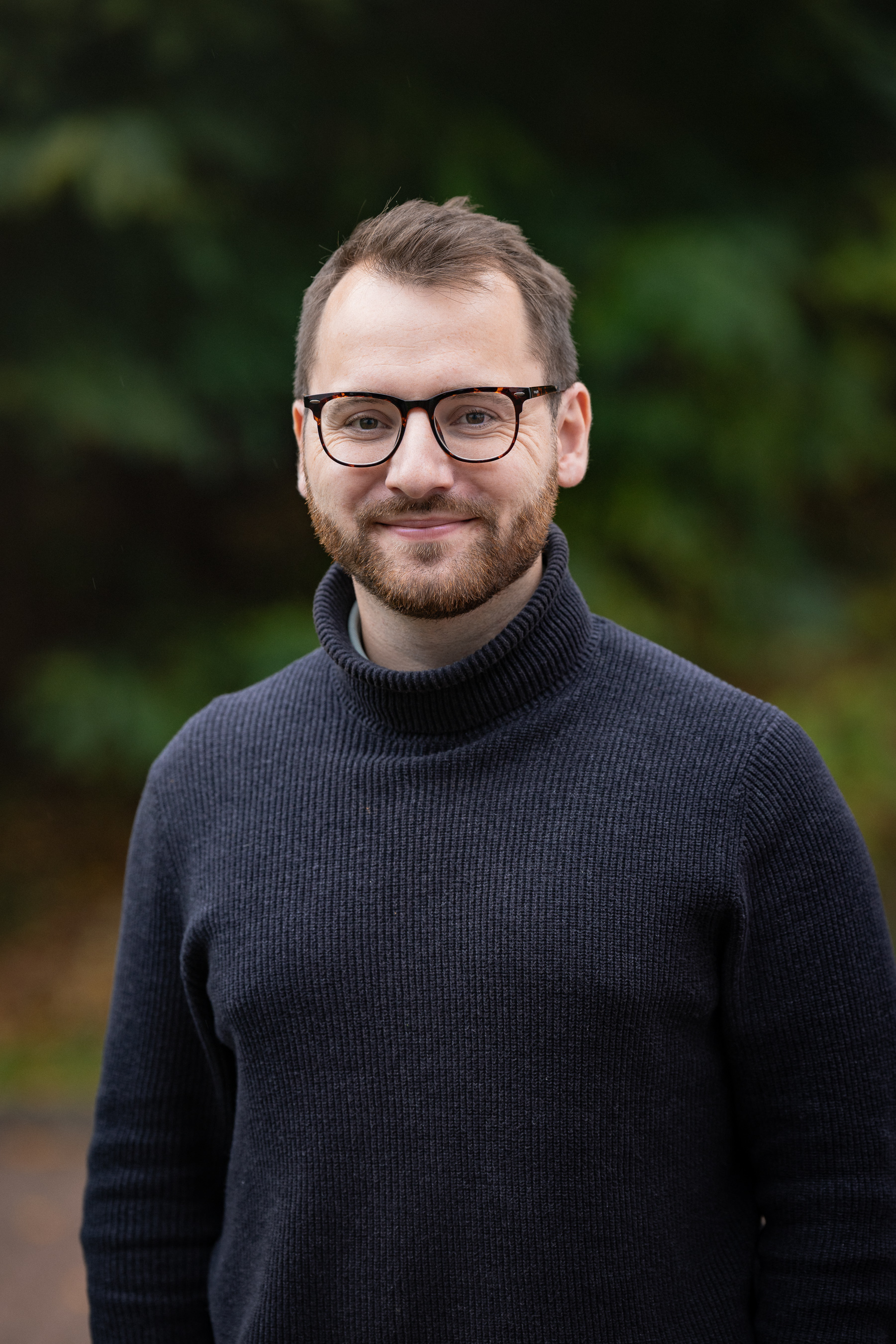
- Papajanovský in 2025

Member of the Chamber of Deputies
- Incumbent
- Assumed office 4 October 2025
- Constituency: Ústí nad Labem Region

Personal details
- Born: 7 November 1994 (age 31)
- Party: Mayors and Independents

Jan Papajanovský (born 7 November 1994) is a Czech politician serving as a member of the Chamber of Deputies since 2025. He has served as mayor of Česká Kamenice since 2018. At the time of taking office, he was 23, making him the youngest mayor of a municipality in the Czech Republic.
