= Carl Weinmüller =

Opera singer and director (1764–1828)

Carl Friedrich Clemens Weinmüller
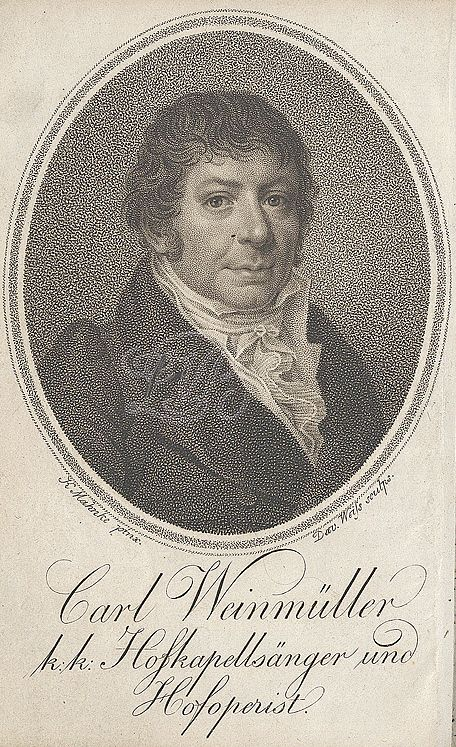
- Engraving of Weinmüller by David Weiss after a painting by Karl Mahnke, c. 1820
- Born: 8 November 1764; Dillingen an der Donau, Bavaria
- Died: 16 March 1828 (aged 63); Vienna, Austrian Empire
- Occupations: Opera singer, theatre director
- Organizations: Imperial Court Opera, Vienna; Wiener Hofmusikkapelle

Carl Friedrich Clemens Weinmüller (also Karl Weinmiller; 8 November 1764 – 16 March 1828) was a German-Austrian opera singer and theatre director. A bass with the Imperial Court Opera in Vienna, he is known for performing Rocco in the premiere of Beethoven's Fidelio.

== Life ==
Weinmüller was born in Dillingen an der Donau on 8 November 1764. He received first musical instruction in the church choir of his hometown. He studied in Vienna. In 1783, he joined a travelling troupe that played in Wiener Neustadt, St. Pölten, Burg Haimburg and other small towns. In 1788, he moved to Ofen and Pest, where he was the first bass and the opera director.

On 6 November 1796 he started with the Viennese Imperial Court Opera, appearing as the pharmacist Stößel in Dittersdorf's Doktor und Apotheker. He was then engaged permanently, together with his wife, by the Imperial Court Opera. He was soon regarded as one of the most important bass singers and also known for his considerable acting talent. From July 1798 until his death, he also belonged to the Wiener Hofmusikkapelle. He enjoyed performing as a concert singer as well, for example at the academies of Joseph Haydn. His voice ranged from D to f′ at the height of his career.

In recognition of his numerous merits, Weinmüller received the citizens diploma of the City of Vienna in 1810. Together with Ignaz Saal and Johann Michael Vogl, he was instrumental in making Beethoven revise his only opera, which had failed in the premiere. Titled Fidelio in its third and final version, it was premiered on 23 May 1814 at the Court Theatre, with Weinmüller as Rocco.

Weinmüller retired on 30 November 1821. His last residence was Ledererhof No. 337, near the Altes Rathaus, where he died in March 1828 from "hardening of the liver" at age 63.

== Family ==
Weinmüller's wife was Aloisia Weinmüller, née Moerisch (1761–1852), who worked at the Viennese court theatres from 1796 to 1798.
