= Léonore, ou L'amour conjugal =

Opéra-comique by Pierre Gaveaux

Léonore, ou L'Amour conjugal (Leonore, or marital love) is an opéra comique in two acts by Pierre Gaveaux after a libretto by Jean-Nicolas Bouilly. It was premiered on 19 February 1798 at the Théâtre Feydeau in Paris.

== Orchestra ==
The orchestration of the opera contains the following instruments:

- winds: two transverse flutes, two oboes, two clarinets, two bassoons
- brass section: two horns, two trumpets, two trombones
- timpani
- strings

== History ==
Bouilly's work was, with regard to the subject matter, a model for the composers Paër's Leonora 1804 and Mayr's L'amor coniugale 1805. Joseph Sonnleithner presented a translation of the original in German, which in turn inspired Beethoven to write his operas Leonore (1805, 1806) and Fidelio (1814).

It is unknown whether or not Beethoven knew the score of Gaveaux' Léonore, and it is quite unlikely that he did.

The opera was performed for the first time in New York in 2017 and this production was recorded.
