= Carlo Angrisani =

Italian operatic bass

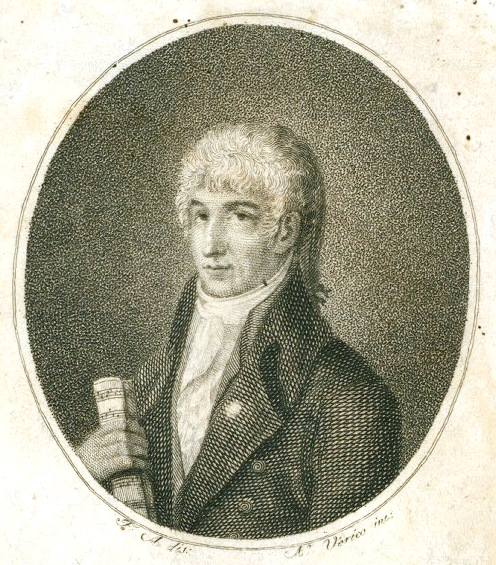
- Portrait f Carlo Angrisani by Antonio Verico

Background information
- Born: 1760; Reggio Emilia
- Died: Unknown
- Genres: Opera
- Occupation: Operatic bass
- Instrument: Vocals

Carlo Angrisani (c. 1760 – ?) was an Italian operatic bass.

He was born in Reggio Emilia. After singing at several theatres in Italy, he appeared at Vienna, where, in 1798 and 1799, he published two collections of Notturni ("nocturnes") for three voices. In 1817 he sang at the King's Theatre in London with Joséphine Fodor, Giuditta Pasta, Violante Camporese, Pierre Begrez, Naldi, and Giuseppe Ambrogietti. His made his first appearance at Covent Garden on 3 March 1820 in a concert of selections from Mozart's Don Giovanni alongside John Braham and other English singers.

His roles in premieres include Sir John Falstaff in Salieri's Falstaff and Peters in Simon Mayr's L'amor coniugale. The New Grove Dictionary of Music and Musicians describes his voice was full, round, and sonorous.
