= Kirchberg am Walde =

- Municipality
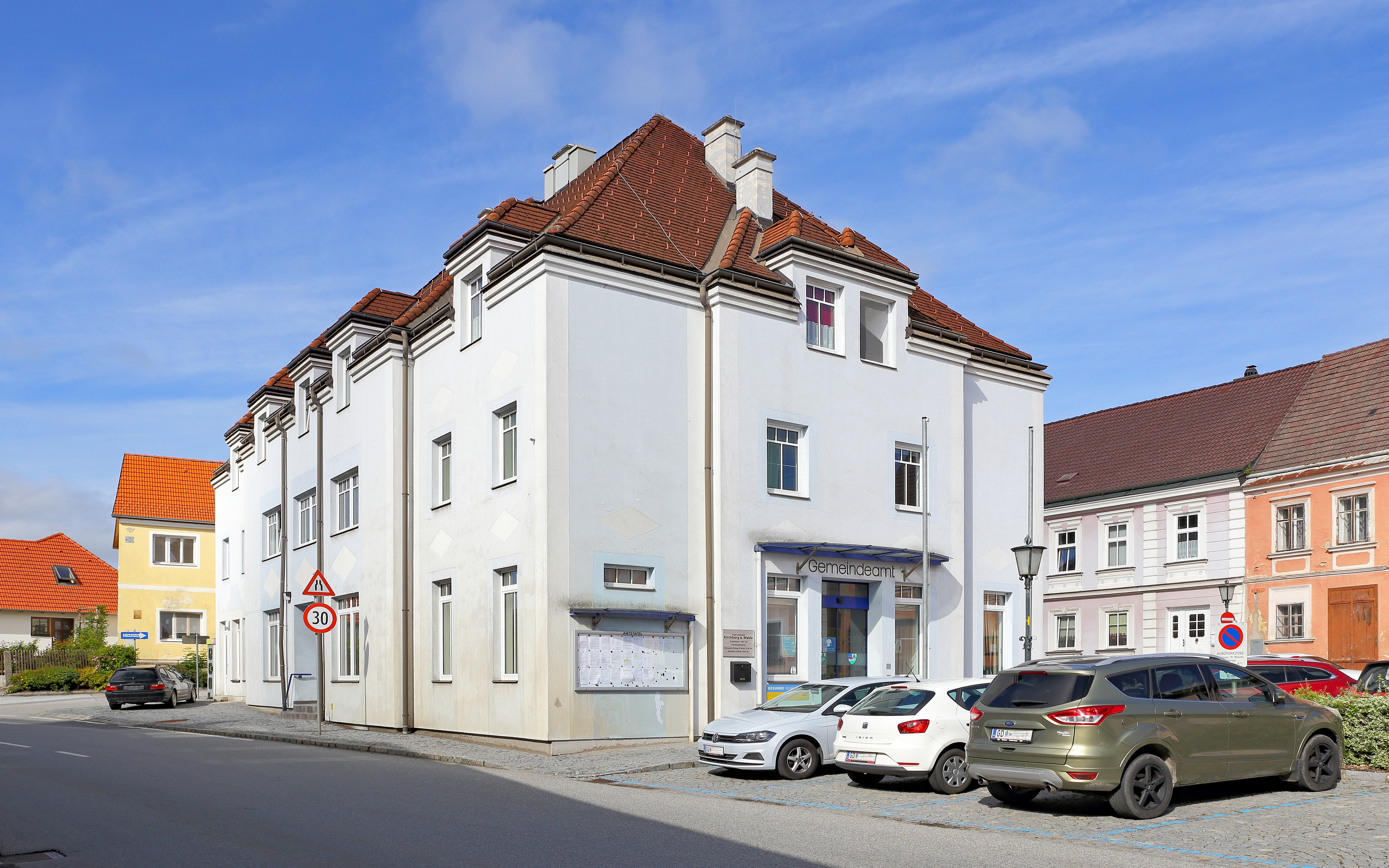
- Municipality office

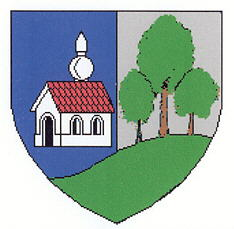
- Coat of arms

- Location within Austria
- Coordinates: 48°43′N 15°5′E
- Country: Austria
- State: Lower Austria
- District: Gmünd

Government
  - Mayor: Karl Schützenhofer

Area
  - Total: 37.79 km^{2} (14.59 sq mi)
- Elevation: 575 m (1,886 ft)

Population (2018-01-01)
  - Total: 1,313
  - Density: 34.74/km^{2} (89.99/sq mi)
- Time zone: UTC+1 (CET)
  - Summer (DST): UTC+2 (CEST)
- Postal code: 3932
- Area code: 02854
- Website: www.kirchberg-walde.gv.at

Kirchberg am Walde is a town in the district of Gmünd in Lower Austria, Austria.

The Austrian operatic bass Johann Michael Weinkopf was born here in 1780.
