= Fidelio =

Ludwig van Beethoven's sole opera

- Opera by Ludwig van Beethoven
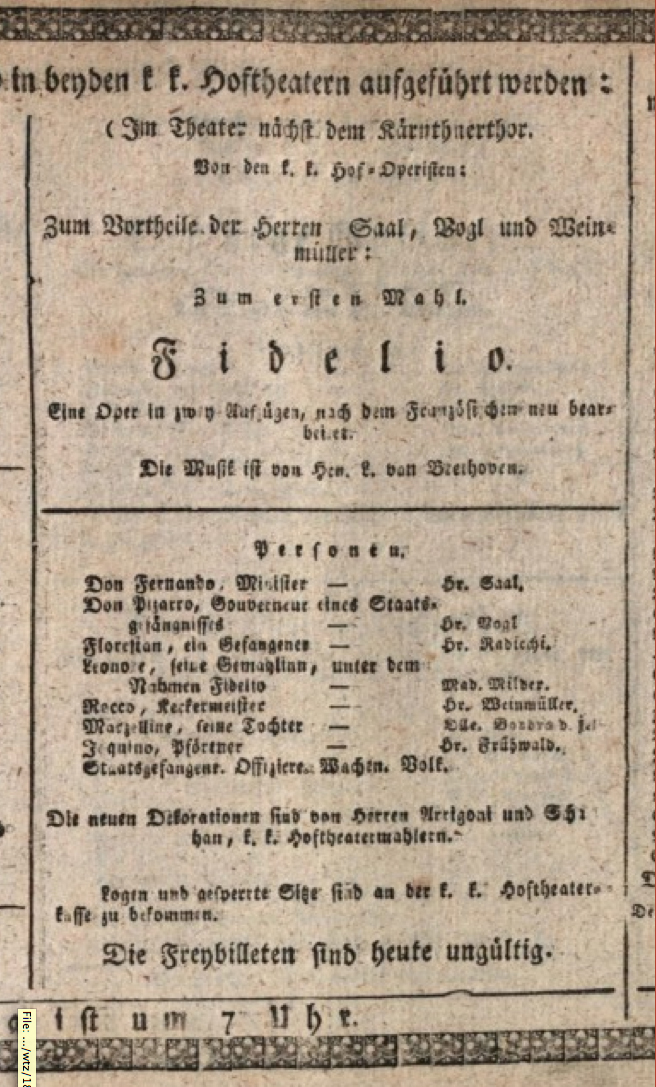
- Fidelio, playbill of the third and finalized premiere at the Kärntnertortheater in Vienna, 23 May 1814
- Librettist: Originally prepared by Joseph Sonnleithner, from the French of Jean-Nicolas Bouilly. Later shortened by Stephan von Breuning and edited by Georg Friedrich Treitschke.
- Language: German
- Premiere: Original premiere "Fidelio" 20 November 1805; Reworked version "Leonore" 29 March 1806; Finalized version "Fidelio" 23 May 1814; First two premieres at Theater an der Wien, Vienna. Final version at Kärntnertortheater, Vienna

Fidelio (/fɪˈdeɪljoʊ/; German: [fiˈdeːlio]), originally titled Leonore, oder Der Triumph der ehelichen Liebe (Leonore, or The Triumph of Marital Love), Op. 72, is the sole opera by German composer Ludwig van Beethoven. The libretto was originally prepared by Joseph Sonnleithner from the French of Jean-Nicolas Bouilly. The opera premiered at Vienna's Theater an der Wien on 20 November 1805. The following year, Beethoven's friend Stephan von Breuning rewrote the libretto, shortening the work from three acts to two. After further work on the libretto by Georg Friedrich Treitschke, a final version was performed at the Kärntnertortheater on 23 May 1814. As these libretto revisions were going on, Beethoven was also revising some of the music. By convention, only the final version is called Fidelio, and the others are referred to as Leonore.

The libretto tells how Leonore, disguised as a prison guard named "Fidelio", rescues her husband Florestan from death in a political prison. Bouilly's scenario fits Beethoven's aesthetic and political outlook: a story of personal sacrifice, heroism, and eventual triumph. With its underlying struggle for liberty and justice mirroring contemporary political movements in Europe, such topics are typical of Beethoven's "middle period". Notable moments in the opera include the "Prisoners' Chorus" (O welche Lust—"O what a joy"), an ode to freedom sung by a chorus of political prisoners, Florestan's vision of Leonore who comes as an angel to rescue him, and the scene in which the rescue finally takes place. The finale celebrates Leonore's bravery with alternating contributions of soloists and chorus.

== Backdrop ==
In its time, Fidelio was Beethoven's contribution to an ongoing and successful tradition of operatic composition; a tradition harder to discern today because none of the operas involved, other than Beethoven's, has survived into the modern repertory. The tradition was imported to Beethoven's Vienna from Revolutionary France and involved work of many composers, most notably Luigi Cherubini, whose work Beethoven (unusually) strongly admired. The new French school arrived in Vienna in 1802 with the performance of Cherubini's Lodoïska, and led, per Dean, to "an avalanche of French operas, many of which became more popular in Vienna than in Paris." Many of these operas were so-called "rescue operas", which Dean describes thus:

The ... singspiel form, the background of domestic realism tinged with comedy, the superposition of a heroic or patriotic story involving violence and often a spectacular catastrophe, a happy end produced not by a deus ex machina but by an act of superhuman courage, a strong ethical content tending to divide the characters into sheep and goats: this was the pattern of rescue opera ... Beethoven adopted it lock, stock, and barrel.

This new kind of heroic opera appealed far more to Beethoven than the (to him) frivolous-seeming dramas of character that had impelled Mozart's earlier work. Beethoven, who heard Cherubini's work in Vienna, joined the new trend with enthusiasm; and indeed Fidelio borrows its plot, characters, and (according to Dean) even certain musical devices from the work of Beethoven's predecessors in the French rescue-opera tradition. These include Pierre Gaveaux's opera Léonore, ou L'amour conjugal (1798) and Ferdinando Paer's Leonora (1804).

== Composition and 19th century performance history ==
Fidelio had a long and complicated history of composition. Beethoven revised Fidelio three times; the work caused Beethoven so much vexation that he vowed never to compose another opera.

The distant origin of Fidelio dates from 1803, when the librettist and impresario Emanuel Schikaneder worked out a contract with Beethoven to write an opera. The contract included free lodging for Beethoven in the apartment complex that was part of Schikaneder's large suburban theater, the Theater an der Wien. Beethoven was to set a new libretto by Schikaneder, entitled Vestas Feuer; however, this libretto was not to Beethoven's liking. He spent about a month composing music for it, then abandoned it when the possibility presented itself of joining the new, to Beethoven more meaningful, French heroic tradition.

The time Beethoven spent on Vestas Feuer was not entirely wasted, as two important numbers from Fidelio, Pizarro's "'Ha! Welch' ein Augenblick!" and the duet "O namenlose Freude" for Leonore and Florestan, both originated as music for Vestas Feuer. Beethoven continued to live at the Theater an der Wien for some time after he had abandoned Vestas Feuer for Fidelio, and was eventually freed from his obligations to Schikaneder after the latter was fired from his post as theater director in 1804.

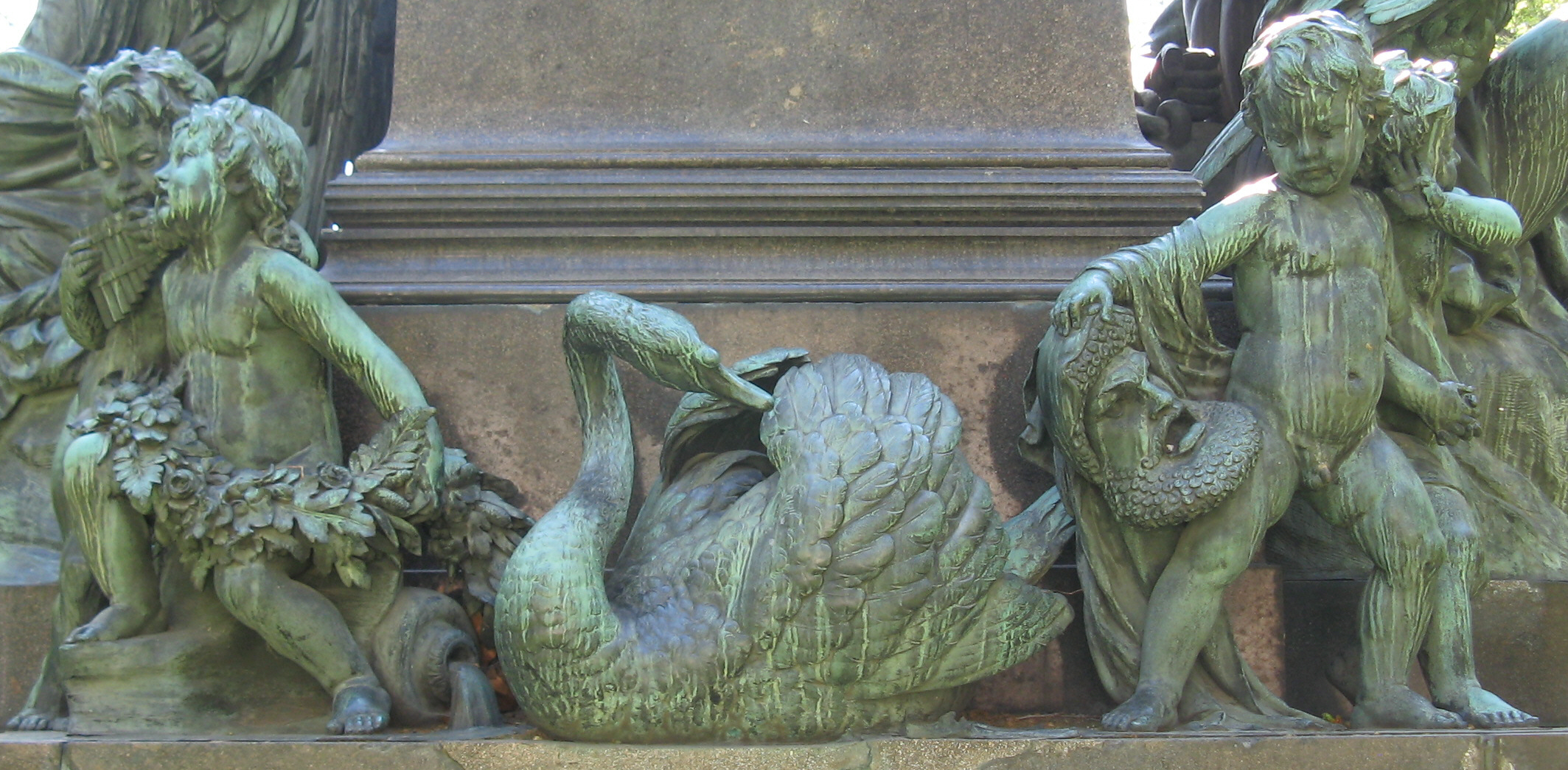
The theatrical mask contemplated by a putto on the Beethoven monument by Kaspar von Zumbusch (Vienna, 1880) commemorates Beethoven's sole opera in the city where it made its debut.

Fidelio itself, which Beethoven began in 1804 immediately after giving up on Vestas Feuer, was first performed in 1805 and was extensively revised by the composer for subsequent performances in 1806 and 1814. Although Beethoven used the title Leonore, oder Der Triumph der ehelichen Liebe ("Leonore, or The Triumph of Married Love"), the 1805 performances were billed as Fidelio at the theatre's insistence, to avoid confusion with the operas by Gaveaux and Paer.

Beethoven published the 1806 libretto and, in 1810, a vocal score under the title Leonore. The current convention is to use the name Leonore for both the 1805 (three-act) and 1806 (two-act) versions and Fidelio only for the final 1814 revision.

The first version, with a three-act German libretto adapted by Joseph Sonnleithner from the French of Jean-Nicolas Bouilly, premiered at the Theater an der Wien on 20 November 1805, with additional performances the following two nights. The success of these performances was hindered by the fact that Vienna was under French military occupation, and most of the audience were French military officers who had little interest in German opera.

After this premiere, Beethoven's friends suggested he revise and shorten the opera into just two acts, and he did so with the help of his close friend, Stephan von Breuning. The composer also wrote a new overture (now known as "Leonore No.3"; see below). In this form, the opera was first performed on 29 March and 10 April 1806, with greater success. Further performances were prevented by a disagreement between Beethoven and the theatre management.

In 1814, Beethoven revised his opera yet again, with additional work on the libretto by Georg Friedrich Treitschke. This version was first performed at the Kärntnertortheater on 23 May 1814, again under the title Fidelio. The 17-year-old Franz Schubert was in the audience, having sold his school books to obtain a ticket. The increasingly deaf Beethoven conducted the performance, "assisted" by Michael Umlauf, who later performed the same task for Beethoven at the premiere of the Ninth Symphony. The role of Pizarro was taken by Johann Michael Vogl, who later became known for his collaborations with Schubert. This version of the opera was a great success, and Fidelio has been part of the operatic repertory ever since.

Although critics have noted the similarity in plot with Gluck's opera Orfeo ed Euridice (1762) — another underground rescue mission in which the protagonist must control, or conceal, his emotions in order to retrieve his spouse — it is not known whether Beethoven or any of the librettists had this in mind while constructing the opera.

No other work of Beethoven's caused him so much frustration and disappointment. He found the difficulties posed by writing and producing an opera so disagreeable, he vowed never to compose another. In a letter to Treitschke he said, "I assure you, dear Treitschke, that this opera will win me a martyr's crown. You have by your co-operation saved what is best from the shipwreck. For all this I shall be eternally grateful to you."

The full score was not published until 1826, and all three versions are known as Beethoven's Opus 72.

The first performance outside Vienna took place in Prague on 21 November 1814, with a revival in Vienna on 3 November 1822. In its two-act version, the opera was staged in London on 18 May 1832 at the King's Theatre, and in New York on 9 September 1839 at the Park Theatre.

== 20th-century performance history ==
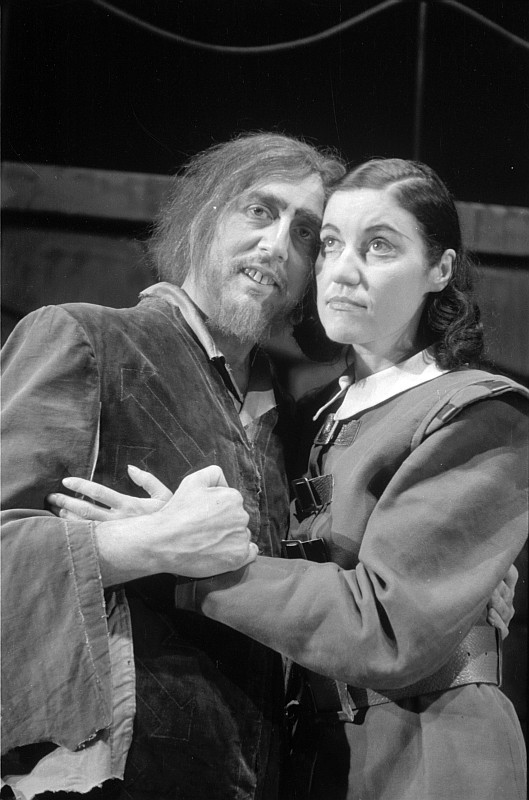
Florestan (Günther Treptow) and Leonore (Karina Kutz); September 1945, Deutsche Oper Berlin

Fidelio was Arturo Toscanini's first complete opera performance given in the United States since 1915 and the first to be broadcast on radio, over the NBC network, in December 1944. Toscanini conducted the NBC Symphony Orchestra, featuring soloists Rose Bampton, Jan Peerce and Eleanor Steber, with the performance divided into two consecutive broadcasts. The recording of the opera was later issued by RCA Victor on LP and CD.

Fidelio was the first opera performed in Berlin after the end of World War II, with the Deutsche Oper staging it under the baton of Robert Heger at the only undamaged theatre, the Theater des Westens, in September 1945. At the time, Thomas Mann remarked: "What amount of apathy was needed [by musicians and audiences] to listen to Fidelio in Himmler's Germany without covering their faces and rushing out of the hall!"

Not long after the end of World War II and the fall of Nazism, conductor Wilhelm Furtwängler remarked in Salzburg in 1948:

[T]he conjugal love of Leonore appears, to the modern individual armed with realism and psychology, irremediably abstract and theoretical.... Now that political events in Germany have restored to the concepts of human dignity and liberty their original significance, this is the opera which, thanks to the music of Beethoven, gives us comfort and courage.... Certainly, Fidelio is not an opera in the sense we are used to, nor is Beethoven a musician for the theater, or a dramaturgist. He is quite a bit more, a whole musician, and beyond that, a saint and a visionary. That which disturbs us is not a material effect, nor the fact of the 'imprisonment'; any film could create the same effect. No, it is the music, it is Beethoven himself. It is this 'nostalgia of liberty' he feels, or better, makes us feel; this is what moves us to tears. His Fidelio has more of the Mass than of the Opera to it; the sentiments it expresses come from the sphere of the sacred, and preach a 'religion of humanity' which we never found so beautiful or necessary as we do today, after all we have lived through. Herein lies the singular power of this unique opera.... Independent of any historical consideration ... the flaming message of Fidelio touches deeply.

We realize that for us Europeans, as for all men, this music will always represent an appeal to our conscience.

On 5 November 1955, the Vienna State Opera was re-opened with Fidelio, conducted by Karl Böhm. This performance was the first live television broadcast by ORF at a time when there were about 800 television sets in Austria.

The first night of Fidelio at the Semperoper in Dresden on 7 October 1989 on the occasion of the 40th anniversary of the DDR (East Germany) coincided with violent demonstrations at the city's main train station. The applause after the "Prisoners' Chorus" interrupted the performance for considerable time, and the production by Christine Mielitz had the chorus appear in normal street clothes at the end, signifying their role as representatives of the audience. Nearly five weeks later, on 9 November 1989, the fall of the Berlin Wall signalled the end of East Germany's regime.

== Overtures ==
Beethoven struggled to produce an appropriate overture for Fidelio, and ultimately went through four versions. His first attempt, for the 1805 premiere, is believed to have been the overture now known as "Leonore No. 2" in C major. Beethoven then wrote a different version for the performances of 1806, creating "Leonore No. 3", also in C major. The latter is considered by many listeners as the greatest of the four overtures, and indeed it is often performed outside the context of the opera, as a concert piece. However, as an intensely dramatic, full-scale symphonic movement, it had the effect of overwhelming the (rather light) initial scenes of the opera. Beethoven accordingly experimented with cutting it back somewhat, for a planned 1808 performance in Prague; this is believed to be the version now called "Leonore No. 1". Finally, for the 1814 revival Beethoven began anew, and with fresh musical material wrote what is now known as the Fidelio overture, in E major. As this somewhat lighter overture seems to work best of the four as a start to the opera, Beethoven's final intentions are generally respected in contemporary productions.

The two scenes of the last act require a major scene change, and it has long been a temptation for conductors to integrate the acclaimed "Leonore No. 3" overture into the opera by performing it during this interval. According to David Cairns, the practice goes back to the middle of the 19th century. Gustav Mahler is particularly remembered for adhering to this practice when he led a performance. When performed at this point in the opera, the overture acts as a kind of musical reprise of the rescue scene that has just taken place.

== Roles ==
Roles, voice types, premiere casts of three versions
Role	Voice type	Premiere cast, First version: 3 acts 20 November 1805 Conductor: Ignaz von Seyfried	Premiere cast, Second version: 2 acts 29 March 1806 Conductor: Ignaz von Seyfried	Premiere cast, Final version: 2 acts 23 May 1814 Conductor: Michael Umlauf
Florestan, a prisoner	tenor	Carl Demmer	Joseph August Röckel	Julius Radichi
Leonore, his wife, disguised as a man under the alias Fidelio	soprano	Anna Milder	Anna Milder	Anna Milder
Rocco, gaoler (guard)	bass	Joseph Rothe	Joseph Rothe	Carl Weinmüller
Marzelline, his daughter	soprano	Louise Müller	Louise Müller	Anna Bondra
Jaquino, assistant to Rocco	tenor	Joseph Caché	Joseph Caché	Joseph Frühwald
Don Pizarro, governor of the prison	baritone	Sebastian Mayer	Sebastian Mayer	Johann Michael Vogl
Don Fernando, King's minister	baritone	Johann Michael Weinkopf	Johann Michael Weinkopf	Ignaz Saal
Two prisoners	tenor and bass	Unknown	Unknown	Unknown
Soldiers, prisoners, townspeople

== Synopsis ==
Two years prior to the opening scene, the Spanish nobleman Florestan has exposed or attempted to expose certain crimes of a rival nobleman, Pizarro. In revenge, Pizarro has secretly imprisoned Florestan in the prison over which he is governor. Simultaneously, Pizarro has spread false rumors about Florestan's death.

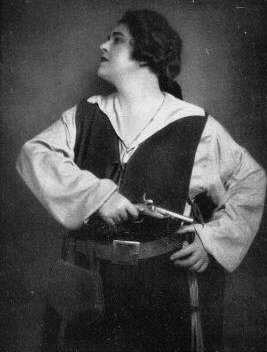
Lotte Lehmann as Leonore

The warden of the prison, Rocco, has a daughter, Marzelline, and an assistant, Jaquino, who is in love with Marzelline. The faithful wife of Florestan, Leonore, suspects that her husband is still alive. Disguised as a boy, under the alias "Fidelio", she gains employment working for Rocco. As the boy Fidelio, she earns the favor of her employer, Rocco, and also the affections of his daughter Marzelline – much to Jaquino's chagrin.

On orders, Rocco has gradually reduced the imprisoned Florestan's rations until he is nearly starved to death.

Place: A Spanish state prison, a few miles from Seville
Time: Late 17th century

=== Act 1 ===
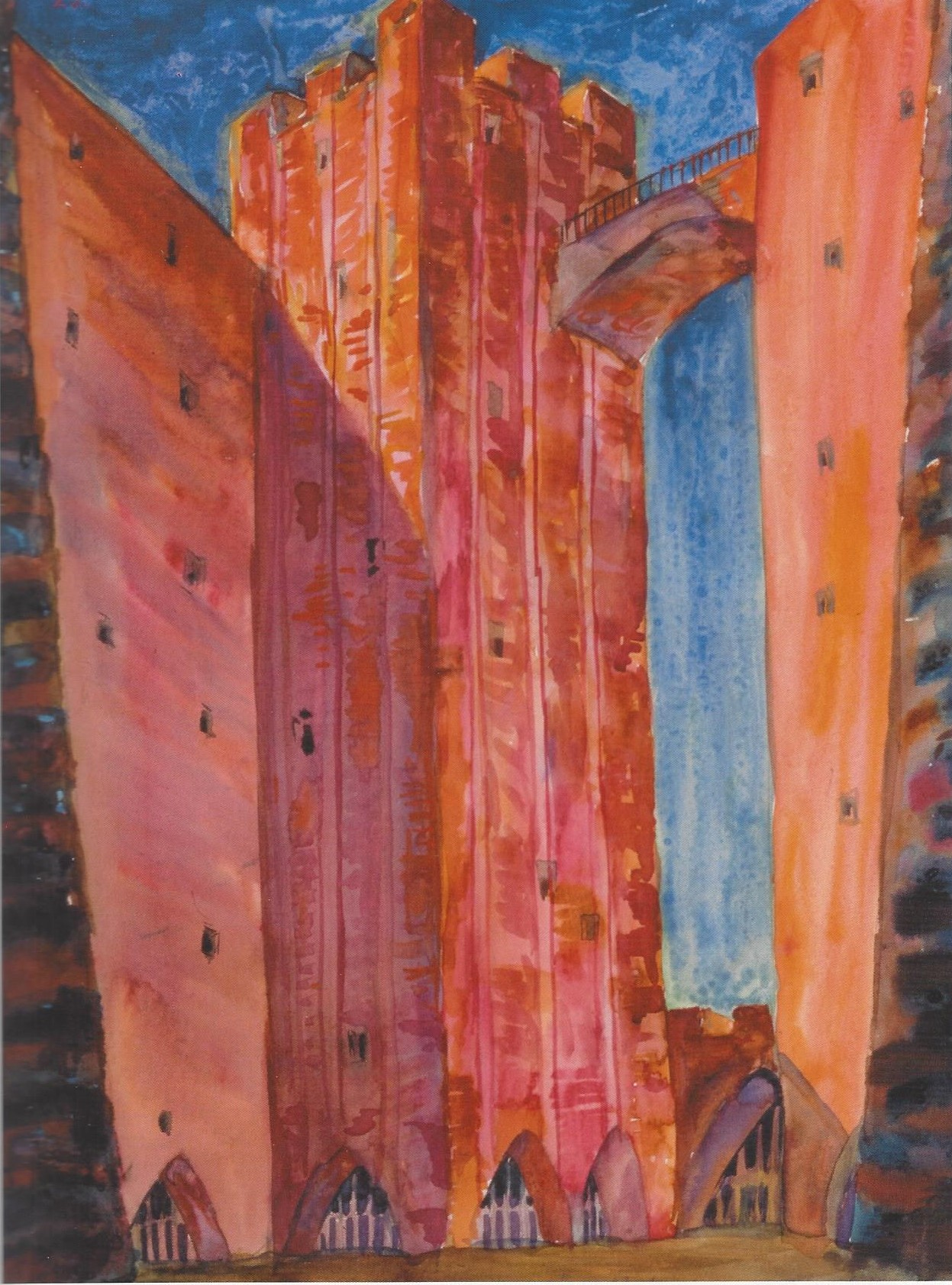
Act 1, prison yard (Halle, 1920)

Jaquino and Marzelline are alone in Rocco's house. Jaquino asks Marzelline when she will agree to marry him, but she says that she will never marry him now that she has fallen in love with Fidelio, unaware that Fidelio is actually Leonore in disguise (Jetzt, Schätzchen, jetzt sind wir allein—"Now, darling, now we are alone"). Jaquino leaves, and Marzelline expresses her desire to become Fidelio's wife (O wär ich schon mit dir vereint—"If only I were already united with thee"). Rocco enters, looking for Fidelio, who then enters carrying a heavy load of newly-repaired chains. Rocco compliments Fidelio, and misinterprets her modest reply as hidden attraction to his daughter. Marzelline, Fidelio, Rocco, and Jaquino sing a quartet about the love Marzelline has for Fidelio (Mir ist so wunderbar—"A wondrous feeling fills me", also known as the Canon Quartet).

Rocco tells Fidelio that as soon as the governor has left for Seville, Marzelline and Fidelio can marry. He tells them, however, that unless they have money, they will not be happy (Hat man nicht auch Gold beineben—"If you don't have any money"). Fidelio demands to know why Rocco will not allow for help in the dungeons, especially as he always seems to return short of breath. Rocco says that there is a dungeon down there where he can never take Fidelio, which houses a man who has been wasting away for two years. Marzelline begs her father to keep Fidelio away from such a terrible sight, but Fidelio claims courage sufficient to cope with it. Rocco and Fidelio sing of courage (Gut, Söhnchen, gut—"All right, sonny, all right"), and Marzelline joins in their acclamations.

Komm, Hoffnung ("Come, Hope")
performed by Alice Guszalewicz

All but Rocco leave. A march is played as Pizarro enters with his guards. Rocco warns Pizarro that the minister plans a surprise visit on the following day to investigate accusations of Pizarro's cruelty. Pizarro exclaims that he cannot let the minister discover the imprisoned Florestan, who has been thought dead. Instead, Pizarro will have Florestan murdered (Ha, welch ein Augenblick—"Hah! What a moment!"). Pizarro orders that a trumpet be sounded as a signal at the minister's arrival. He offers Rocco money to kill Florestan, but Rocco refuses (Jetzt, Alter, jetzt hat es Eile!—"Now, old man, we must hurry!"). Pizarro says he will kill Florestan himself instead, and orders Rocco to dig a grave for him in the floor of the dungeon. Once the grave is ready, Rocco is to sound the alarm, upon which Pizarro will come into the dungeon and kill Florestan. Fidelio, hearing Pizarro's plot, is agitated, but hopes to rescue Florestan (Abscheulicher! Wo eilst du hin? and Komm, Hoffnung, lass den letzten Stern—"Monster! Where are you off to so fast?" and "Come, hope, let the last star").

Jaquino once again begs Marzelline to marry him, but she continues to refuse. Fidelio, hoping to discover Florestan, asks Rocco to let the poor prisoners roam in the garden and enjoy the beautiful weather. Marzelline similarly begs him, and Rocco agrees to distract Pizarro while the prisoners are set free. The prisoners, ecstatic at their temporary freedom, sing joyfully (O welche Lust—"O what a joy"), but remembering that they might be caught by the prison's governor, Pizarro, are soon quiet.

After meeting with Pizarro, Rocco reenters and tells Fidelio that Pizarro will allow the marriage, and Fidelio will also be permitted to join Rocco on his rounds in the dungeon (Nun sprecht, wie ging's?—"Speak, how did it go?"). Rocco and Fidelio prepare to go to Florestan's cell, with the knowledge that he must be killed and buried within the hour. Fidelio is shaken; Rocco tries to discourage Fidelio from coming, but Fidelio insists. As they prepare to leave, Jaquino and Marzelline rush in and tell Rocco to run, as Pizarro has learned that the prisoners have been allowed to roam, and is furious (Ach, Vater, Vater, eilt!—"O, father, father, hurry!").

Before they can leave, Pizarro enters and demands an explanation. Rocco, thinking quickly, answers that the prisoners were given a little freedom in honor of the Spanish king's name-day, and quietly suggests that Pizarro should save his anger for the prisoner in the dungeon below. Pizarro tells him to hurry and dig the grave, and then announces that the prisoners will be locked up again. Rocco, Leonore, Jacquino, and Marzelline reluctantly usher the prisoners back to their cells (Leb wohl, du warmes Sonnenlicht—"Farewell, you warm sunshine").

=== Act 2 ===
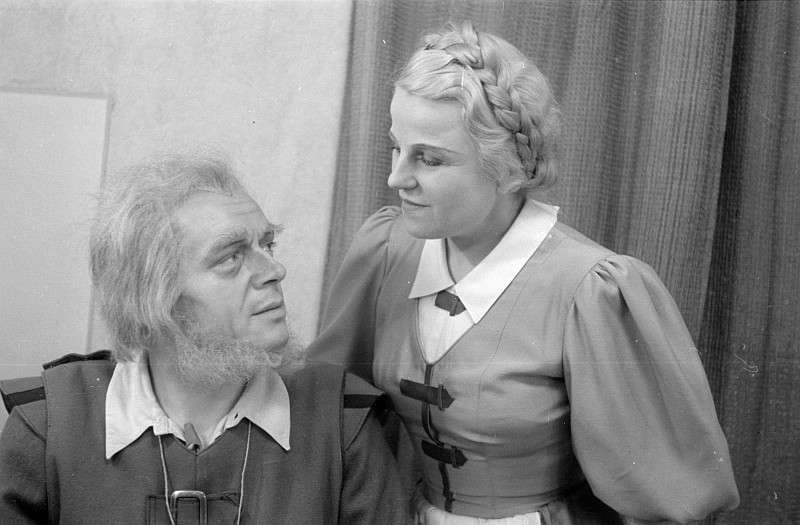
Rocco (Wilhelm Schirp) and Marzelline (Irma Beilke); September 1945, Deutsche Oper Berlin

Florestan is alone in his cell, deep inside the dungeons. He sings first of his trust in God, and then has a vision of his wife Leonore coming to save him (Gott! Welch Dunkel hier!—"God! What darkness here" and In des Lebens Frühlingstagen—"In the spring days of life"). Florestan collapses and falls asleep, while Rocco and Fidelio come to dig his grave. As they dig, Rocco urges Fidelio to hurry (Wie kalt ist es in diesem unterirdischen Gewölbe!—"How cold it is in this underground chamber" and Nur hurtig fort, nur frisch gegraben—"Come get to work and dig", the "Gravedigging Duet").

Florestan awakes and Fidelio recognizes him. When Florestan learns that the prison he is in belongs to Pizarro, he asks that a message be sent to his wife, Leonore, but Rocco says that it is impossible. Florestan begs for a drop to drink, and Rocco tells Fidelio to give him one. Florestan does not recognize Fidelio, his wife Leonore in disguise, but tells Fidelio that there will be reward for the good deed in Heaven (Euch werde Lohn in bessern Welten—"You shall be rewarded in better worlds"). Fidelio further begs Rocco to be allowed to give Florestan a crust of bread, and Rocco consents.

Rocco obeys his orders and sounds the alarm for Pizarro, who appears and asks if all is ready. Rocco says that it is, and instructs Fidelio to leave the dungeon, but Fidelio hides instead. Pizarro reveals his identity to Florestan, who accuses him of murder (Er sterbe! Doch er soll erst wissen—"Let him die! But first he should know"). As Pizarro brandishes a dagger, Fidelio leaps between him and Florestan and reveals her identity as Leonore, the wife of Florestan. Pizarro raises his dagger to kill her, but she pulls a gun and threatens to shoot him.

Just then, the trumpet is heard, announcing the arrival of the minister. Jaquino enters, followed by soldiers, to announce that the minister is waiting at the gate. Rocco tells the soldiers to escort Governor Pizarro upstairs. Florestan and Leonore sing to their victory as Pizarro declares that he will have revenge, while Rocco expresses his fear of what is to come (Es schlägt der Rache Stunde—"Revenge's bell tolls"). Together, Florestan and Leonore sing a love duet (O namenlose Freude!—"O unnamed joy!").

Here, the overture "Leonore No. 3" is sometimes played.

The prisoners and townsfolk sing to the day and hour of justice which has come (Heil sei dem Tag!—"Hail to the day!"). The minister, Don Fernando, announces that tyranny has ended. Rocco enters, with Leonore and Florestan, and he asks Don Fernando to help them (Wohlan, so helfet! Helft den Armen!—"So help! Help the poor ones!"). Rocco explains how Leonore disguised herself as Fidelio to save her husband. Previously in love with Fidelio, Marzelline is shocked. Rocco describes Pizarro's murder plot, and Pizarro is led away to prison. Florestan is released from his chains by Leonore, and the crowd sings the praises of Leonore, the loyal savior of her husband (Wer ein holdes Weib errungen—"Who has got a good wife").

== Instrumentation ==
The orchestra consists of one piccolo, two flutes, two oboes, two clarinets, two bassoons, one contrabassoon, four horns, two trumpets, two trombones, timpani, and strings. There is also an offstage trumpet.

== Recordings ==
- Fidelio discography
