= Anna Bondra =

Austrian soprano

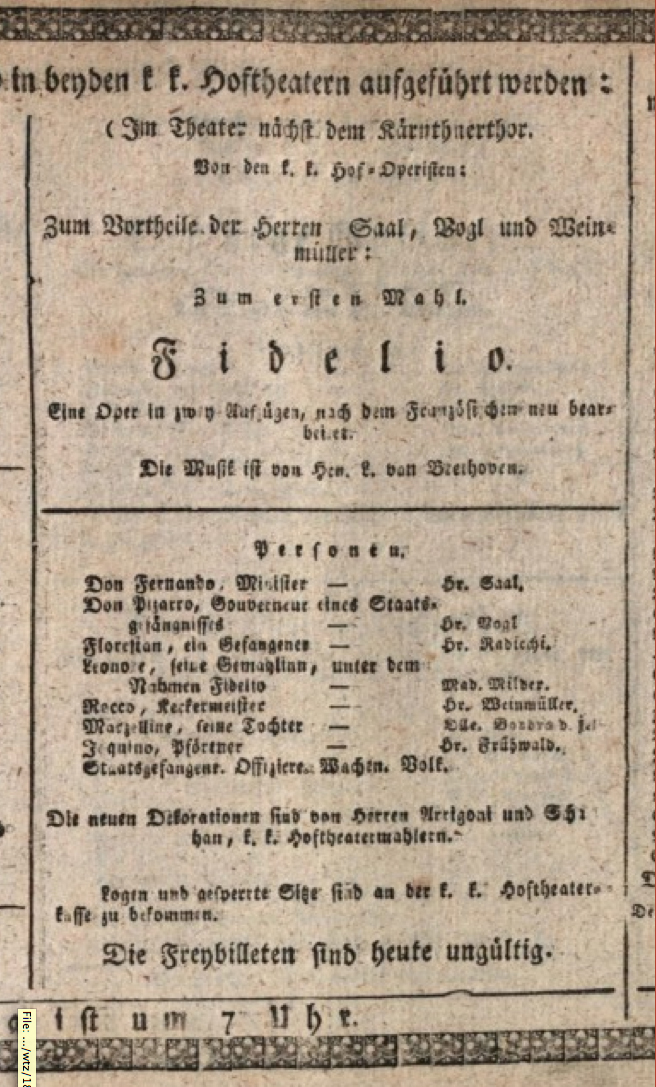
Playbill for the premiere of the third version of Fidelio on 23 May 1814 in the Kärntnertortheater

Anna "Nanette" Bondra (21 March 1798 – 11 July 1836) was an Austrian operatic soprano and mezzo-soprano.

== Life ==
Born in Vienna (Habsburg monarchy), Anna (auch Nanette) Bondra, the daughter of a Viennese choir director, was the younger sister of the singer Therese Bondra (1794-1816). From January 22, 1811 to June 30, 1822 she was a member of the k.k. Hoftheater and subsequently belonged to the ensemble of the Italian Opera in Vienna.

Her embodiment of Marcelline at the premiere of the third, final version of Beethoven's Fidelio, which took place on 23 May 1814 at the Theater am Kärntnertor, is of significance to music history. In order to distinguish her from her older sister, she was mentioned on the notice as "Dlle. Bondra d.j.".

Later she also sang mezzo-soprano roles and was successful as a concert soloist.

"Anna Bondra, opera singer at the K.K. Hoftheater nächst dem Kärntnerthore" last lived in the Kärntner Straße No. 1076 and died at the age of only 38 years after a Scarlet fever "from deposition of the scarlet rash on the brain".
