= Česká Kamenice =

- Town
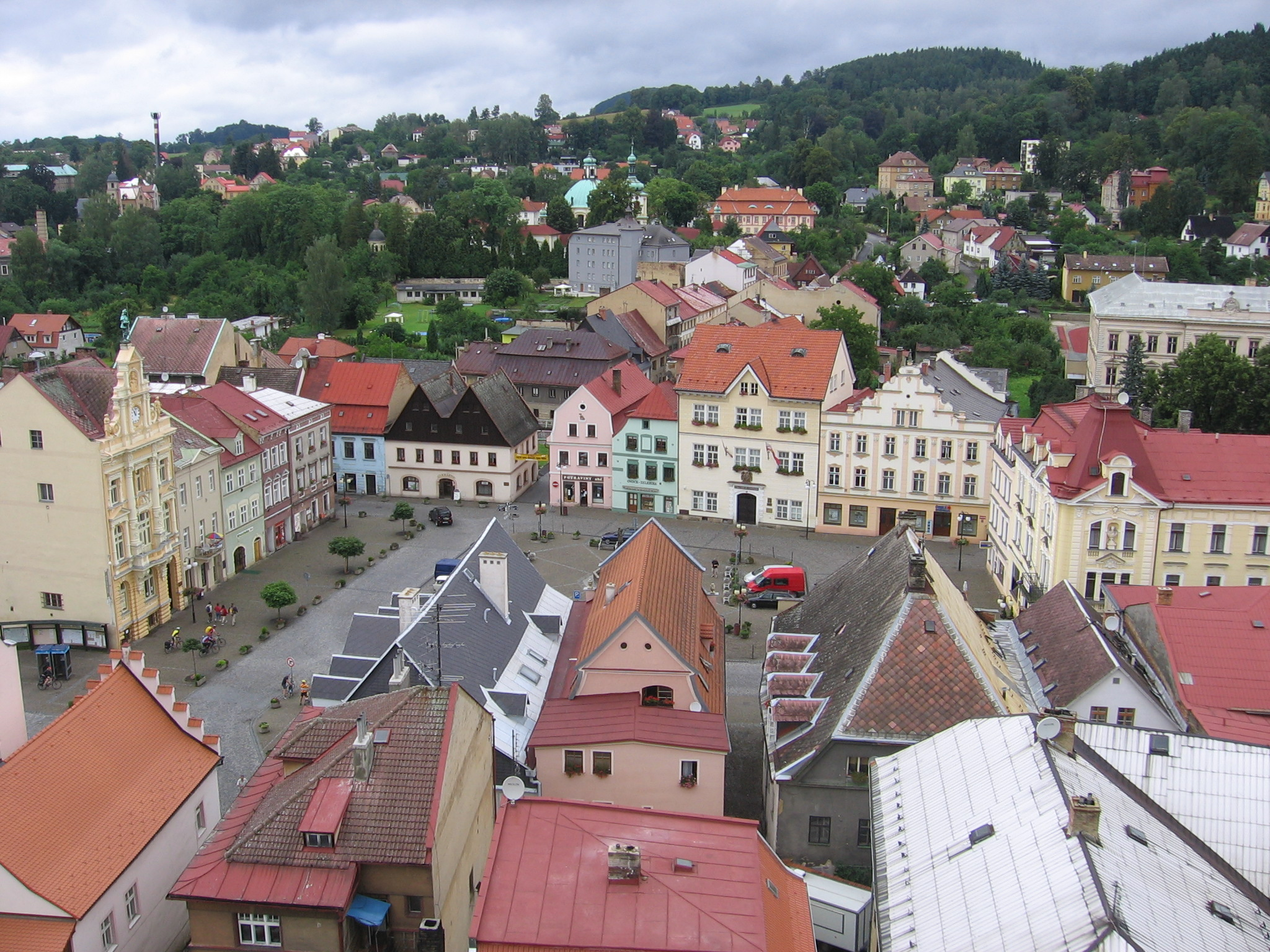
- The square Náměstí Míru

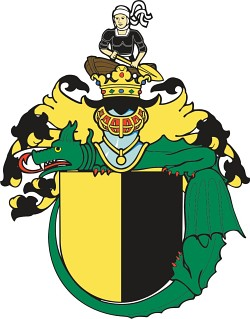
- Flag Coat of arms

- Location in the Czech Republic
- Coordinates: 50°47′52″N 14°25′4″E
- Country: Czech Republic
- Region: Ústí nad Labem
- District: Děčín
- First mentioned: 1352

Government
  - Mayor: Jan Papajanovský

Area
  - Total: 38.77 km^{2} (14.97 sq mi)
- Elevation: 301 m (988 ft)

Population (2026-01-01)
  - Total: 4,984
  - Density: 128.6/km^{2} (333.0/sq mi)
- Time zone: UTC+1 (CET)
  - Summer (DST): UTC+2 (CEST)
- Postal code: 407 21
- Website: www.ceska-kamenice.cz

Česká Kamenice (Czech pronunciation: [ˈtʃɛskaː ˈkamɛɲɪtsɛ]; German: Böhmisch Kamnitz) is a town in Ústí nad Labem Region of the Czech Republic. It has about 5,000 inhabitants. The town is located on the Kamenice River, on the border of three hilly nature regions.

Česká Kamenice was probably founded in the 1270s. The historic town centre is well preserved and is protected as an urban monument zone. The main landmark of the town is the Church of Saint James the Great.

== Administrative division ==
Česká Kamenice consists of ten municipal parts (in brackets population according to the 2021 census):

- Česká Kamenice (2,792)
- Dolní Kamenice (990)
- Filipov (40)
- Horní Kamenice (549)
- Huníkov (63)
- Kamenická Nová Víska (82)
- Kerhartice (164)
- Líska (136)
- Pekelský Důl (69)
- Víska pod Lesy (30)

== Etymology ==
The name Kamenice was transferred to the settlement from the Kamenice River. In the 14th century, the settlement was called Německá Kamenice ('German Kamenice') to distinguish it from nearby Srbská Kamenice. From the 17th century, the name Česká Kamenice ('Bohemian Kamenice') is used.

== Geography ==
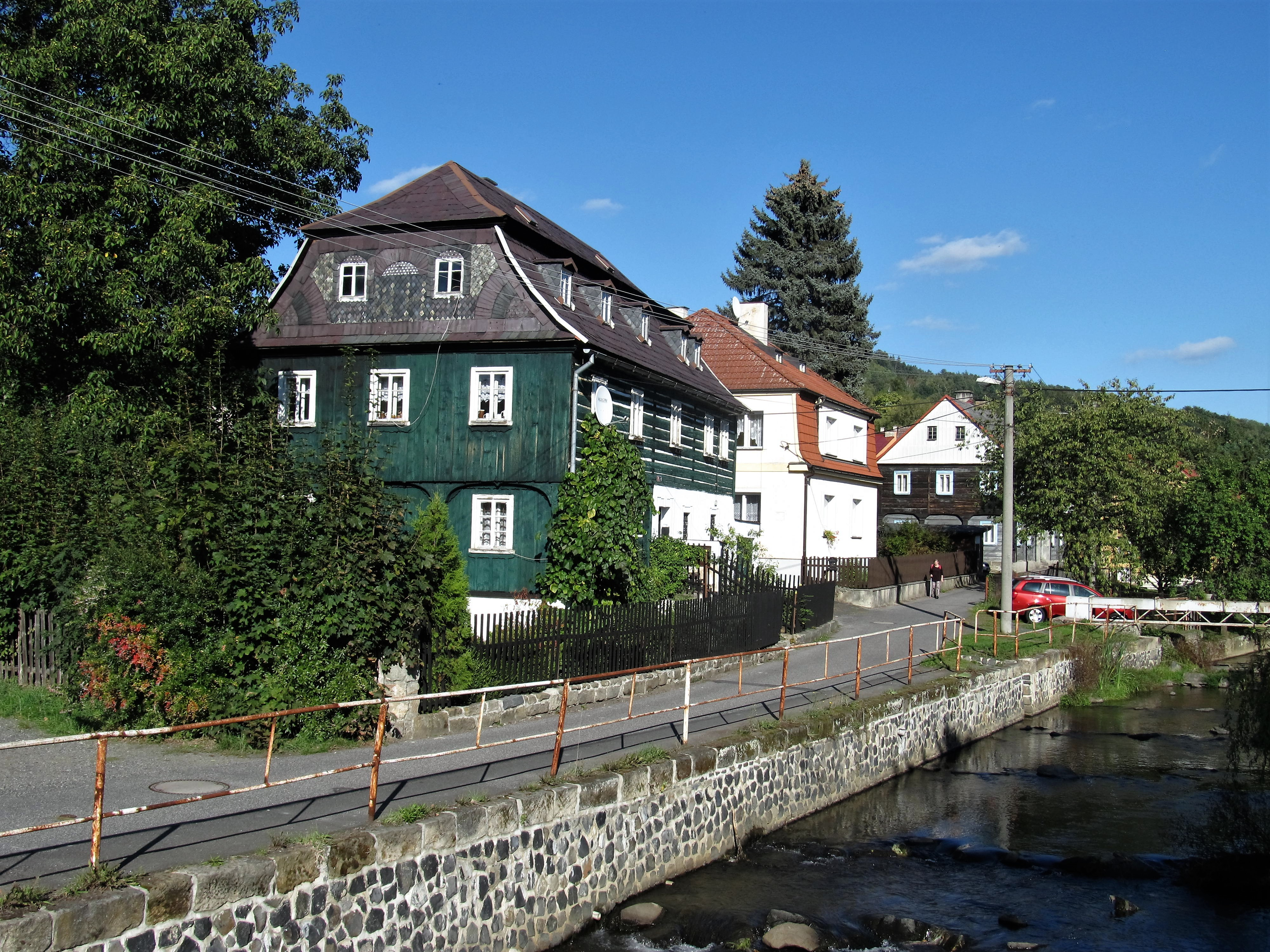
Kamenice River in Česká Kamenice

Česká Kamenice is located about 13 kilometres (8 mi) east of Děčín. The municipal territory is hilly and extends into three geomorphological regions: Lusatian Mountains, Central Bohemian Uplands and Elbe Sandstone Mountains. The highest point is the hill Studenec at 737 m (2,418 ft) above sea level. The Kamenice River and several streams flow through Česká Kamenice.

== History ==
The first written mention of Česká Kamenice is from 1352. The town was founded at the crossroads of two paths, the so-called "Bohemian Road" and the "Lusatian Road", probably in the area of an older Slavic settlement. It was founded before 1283, probably in the 1270s during the reign of King Ottokar II, when the colonisation of the region culminates mainly in settlers from neighbouring Saxony.

=== Concentration camp ===
In spring 1944, the Rabstein sub-camp of Flossenbürg concentration camp was created here, with a capacity of 600 prisoners. At the end of the war, 1,500 inmates were incarcerated in the camp. The camp provided workers for the nearby underground aircraft factory in Janská, 3 km (2 mi) west of Česká Kamenice. The number of inmate deaths is not known due to the destruction of all camp documentation. The foundations of the camp buildings remain visible, along with a memorial and historical overview.

== Demographics ==
Historical population

Year	Pop.	±%
1869	8,243	—
1880	9,036	+9.6%
1890	9,008	−0.3%
1900	9,308	+3.3%
1910	9,675	+3.9%

Year	Pop.	±%
1921	8,786	−9.2%
1930	9,284	+5.7%
1950	5,383	−42.0%
1961	5,560	+3.3%
1970	5,477	−1.5%

Year	Pop.	±%
1980	5,585	+2.0%
1991	5,646	+1.1%
2001	5,492	−2.7%
2011	5,525	+0.6%
2021	5,095	−7.8%

Source: Censuses

== Transport ==
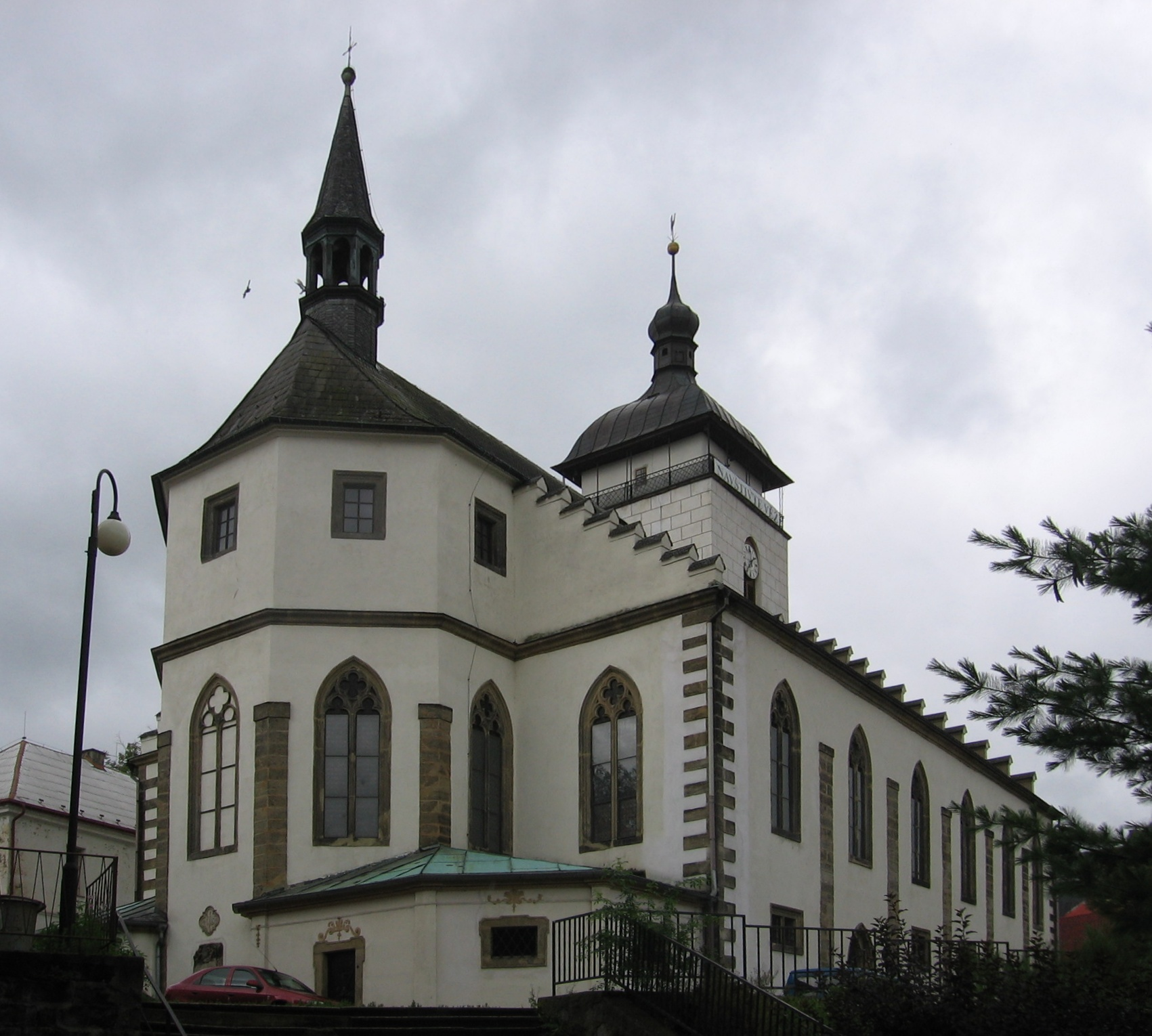
Church of Saint James the Great

The I/13 road (the section from Liberec to Děčín, part of the European route E442) runs through the town.

Česká Kamenice is located on the railway line Děčín–Rumburk. Česká Kamenice is also connected with Kamenický Šenov by a short railway line. Historic trains run on it. It is only in operation during the summer tourist season and on weekends in some months out of season.

== Sights ==
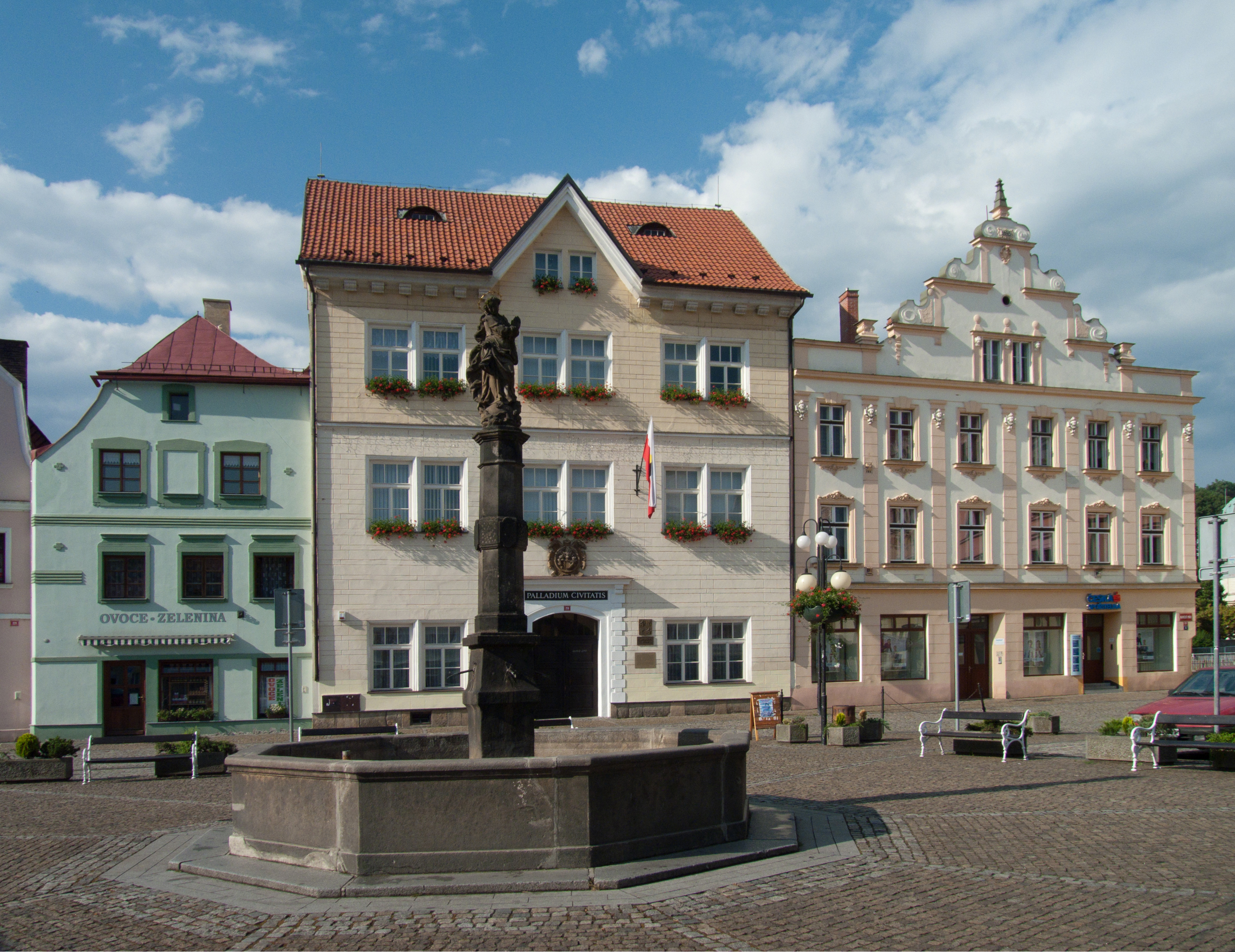
Fountain and town hall on the square

The square Náměstí Míru and its surroundings form the historic town centre. The stone Renaissance fountain on the square is from 1574. The main landmarks of the centre are the Church of Saint James the Great, Evangelical church, Chapel of the Nativity of the Virgin Mary, Kamenice Castle and Salhausen Manor House. There are many preserved houses in the Neoclassical and Art Nouveau styles.

The Church of Saint James the Great was built in the late Gothic style in 1562, on the site of a church founded in 1352. In 1604–1605, it was modified to its present form.

The Chapel of the Nativity of the Virgin Mary was built in the Baroque style in 1736–1739, according to the design by Octavio Broggio. It is a Marian pilgrimage site, created for the supposedly miraculous statue of the Madonna from 1680.

Due to the natural conditions, there are several rocky lookouts in the area. On the hill Studenec is an iron observation tower from 1888, which is a technical monument. The ruin of the Česká Kamenice Castle is preserved on the hill Zámecký vrch. There is a wooden observation tower in its premises.

== Notable people ==
- Joseph Rothe (1759–1808), Austrian opera singer
- Johann Baptist Emanuel Pohl (1782–1834), Austrian botanist, entomologist and geologist
- Antonín Dvořák (1841–1904), composer; took organ and music-theory lessons here in 1856
- Hannes Hegen (1925–2014), German illustrator and caricaturist
- Sigurd Hofmann (1944–2022), German physicist

== Twin towns – sister cities ==
Česká Kamenice is twinned with:

- Bad Schandau, Germany

== Gallery ==
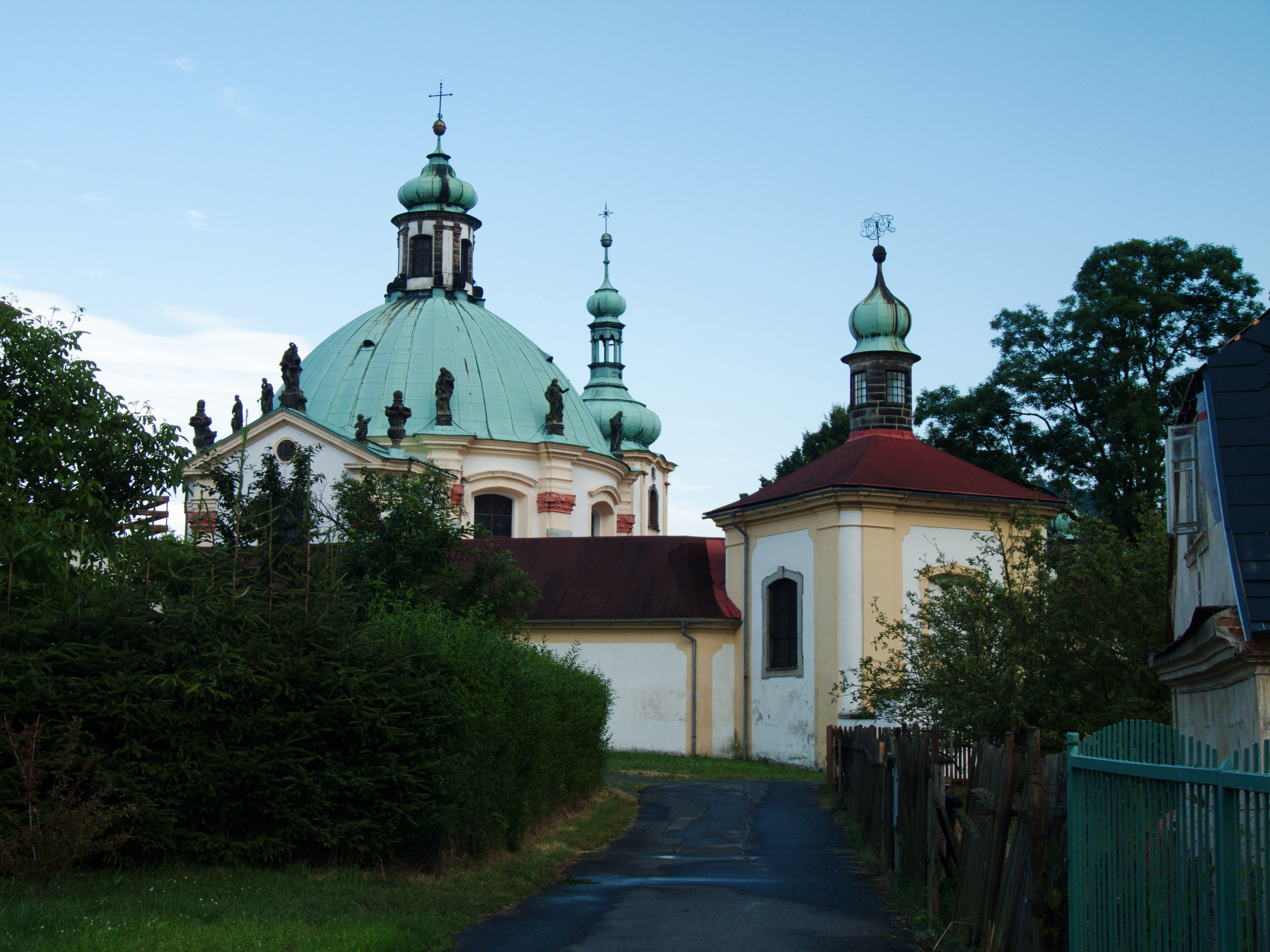
Chapel of the Nativity of the Virgin Mary

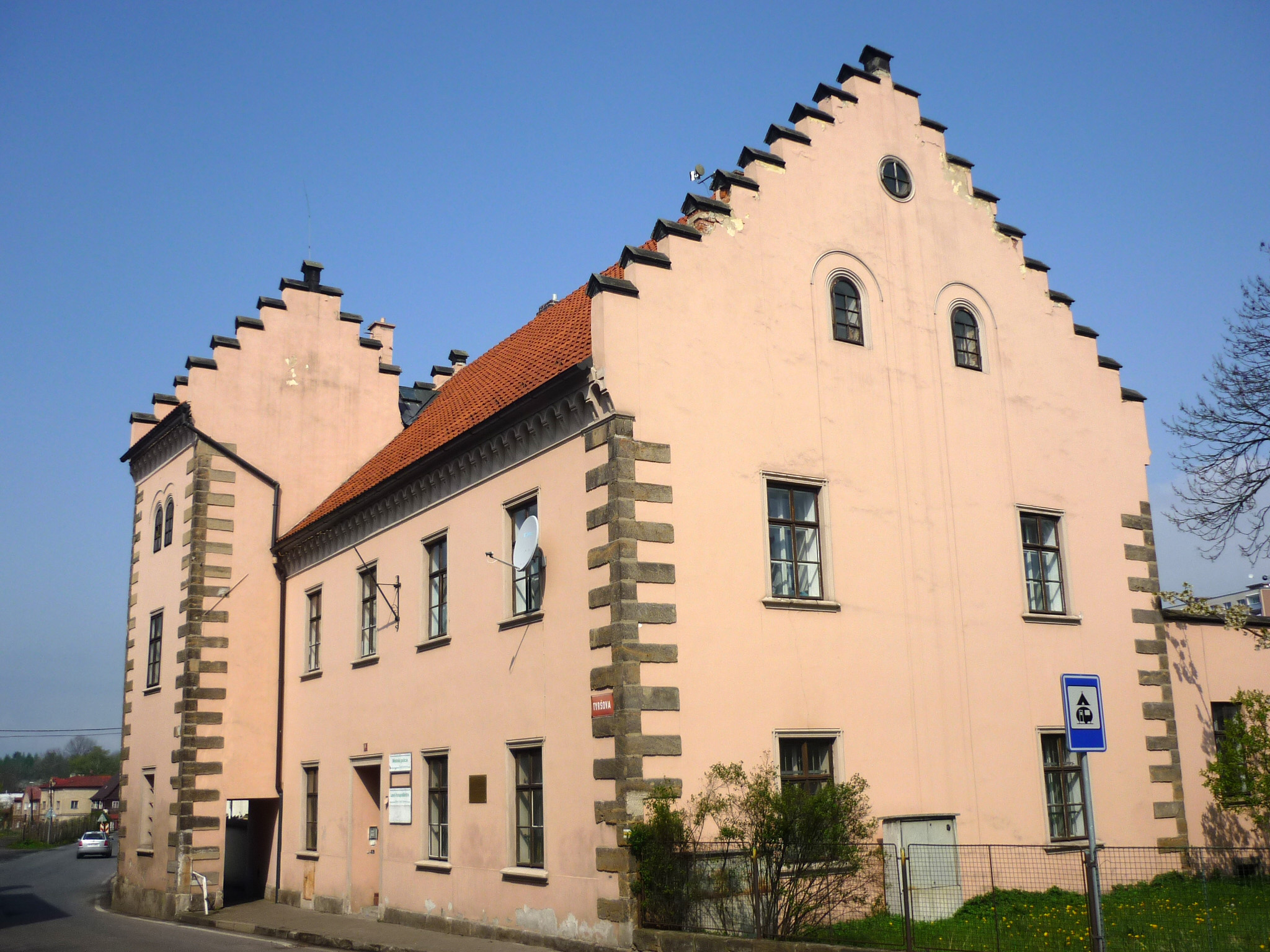
Salhausen Manor House

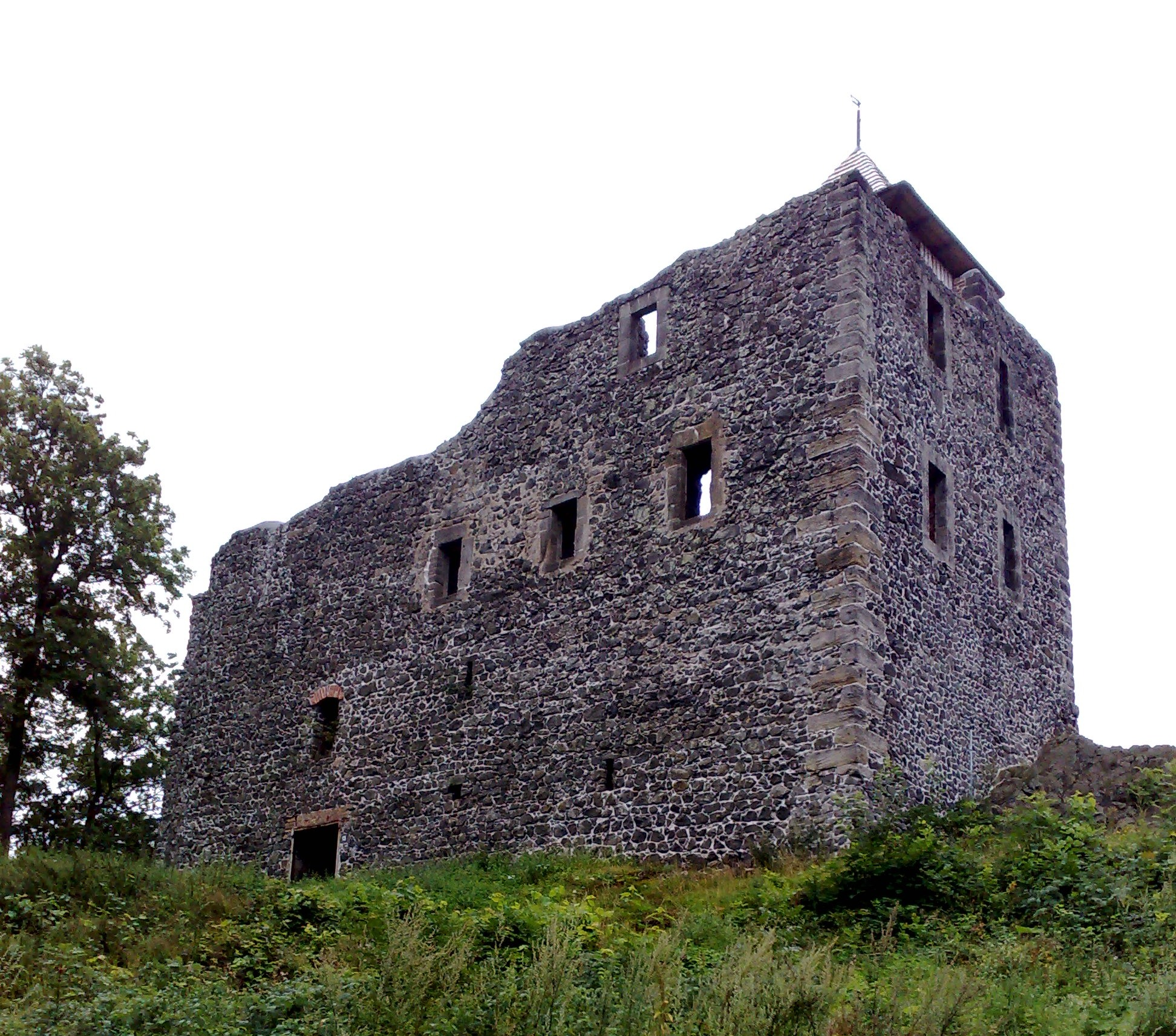
Kamenice Castle

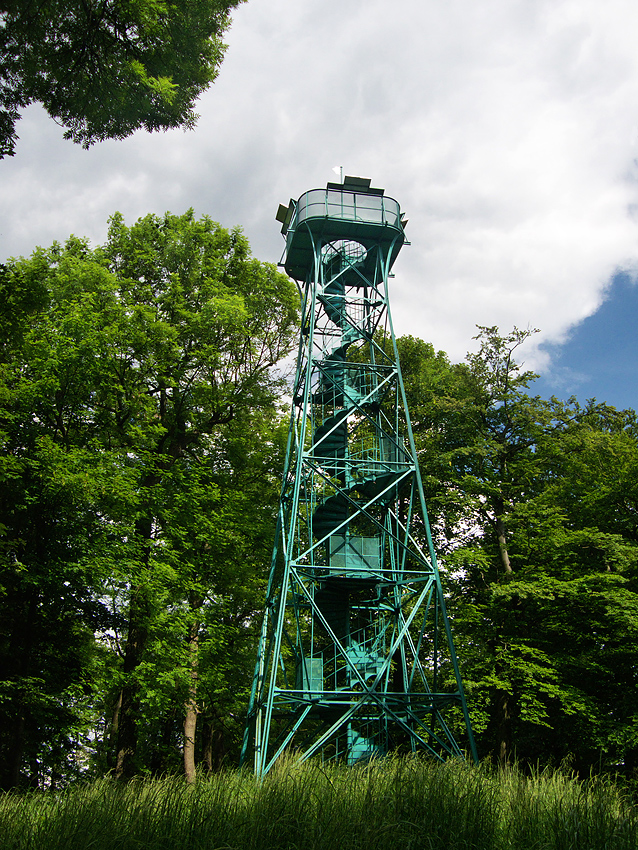
Observation tower on Studenec
