= Leonora (opera) =

1804 opera by Ferdinando Paer

- Opera by Ferdinando Paer
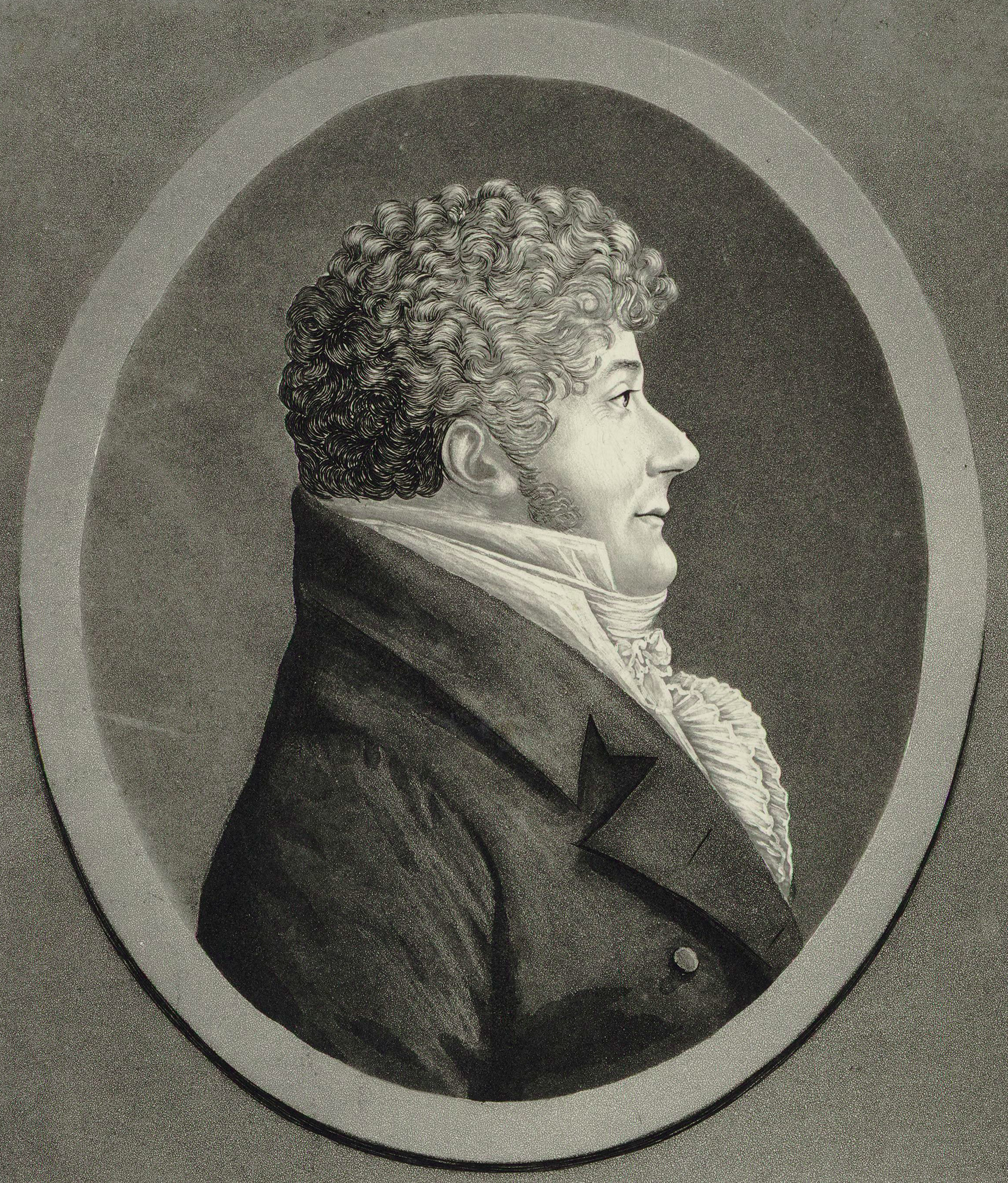
- Ferdinando Paer, engraving by Edme Quenedey des Ricets, 1809
- Librettist: Giovanni Schmidt
- Language: Italian
- Based on: Jean-Nicolas Bouilly's Léonore, ou L'amour conjugal
- Premiere: 3 October 1804; Kleines Kurfürstliches Theater, Dresden

Leonora, ossia L’amore coniugale (Leonora or Conjugal Love) is an opera (specifically a dramma semiserio) in two acts by the Italian composer Ferdinando Paer. The libretto, by Giovanni Schmidt, is based on Léonore, ou L'amour conjugal (1794) by Jean-Nicolas Bouilly, which was also the source of Beethoven's Fidelio. Beethoven himself owned a score of Paer's opera and it is believed to have had some influence on his work. Leonora was first performed at the Kleines Kurfürstliches Theater, Dresden, on 3 October 1804 with the composer's wife singing the title role.

== Roles ==
Role	Voice type	Premiere cast, 3 October 1804
Leonora	soprano	Francesca Riccardi-Paer
Marcellina	soprano	Charlotte Häser
Florestano	tenor	
Don Fernando	tenor	
Don Pizarro	tenor	
Rocco	bass	
Giacchino	baritone	

== Synopsis ==
Leonora disguises herself as a man in order to infiltrate the prison where her husband, Florestano, is being held by his enemy, Don Pizarro. She fools the jailer Rocco into giving her a job. When Don Pizarro hears of the imminent arrival of the governor, Don Fernando, he orders Rocco to execute Florestano. Leonora accompanies Rocco to the underground cell where Florestano is being held then threatens the jailer with a pistol until Don Fernando arrives and Florestano is freed.

== Performances ==
The opera was revived in Dresden in 1821. Probably the first performance since then was given at Schwetzingen in 1976 under Peter Maag, who had discovered the score in Parma, Paer's birthplace. This was recorded live and issued on the MRF label. Soloists were: Carson/Casula/Jerusalem/Frusoni/Stavrù/Luccardi/Tadeo-G.

Two years later (1978) Decca made a studio recording, also under Maag: Koszut/Gruberová/van Kesteren/Jerusalem/Orth/Brendel/Tadeo-G with the Bavarian Radio Symphony Orchestra. This was in stereo and issued in the U.S. as London OSA 13133.

In November 2000, Zürich Opera staged a production of Leonora at its “branch” theatre in Winterthur, with the Romanian soprano Iulia Isaev as Leonora. Florestano was sung by a 31 year-old newcomer to Zürich, Jonas Kaufmann. The UK première was given by Bampton Classical Opera in 2008, in English. Chicago Opera Theatre has announced it will perform Leonora in October 2024, the opera's American premiere.

== Sources ==
- The Viking Opera Guide ed. Holden (Viking, 1993)
- Del Teatro (in Italian)
- Bampton Classical Opera - Paer
