= Ignaz Saal =

German singer and actor (1761–1836)

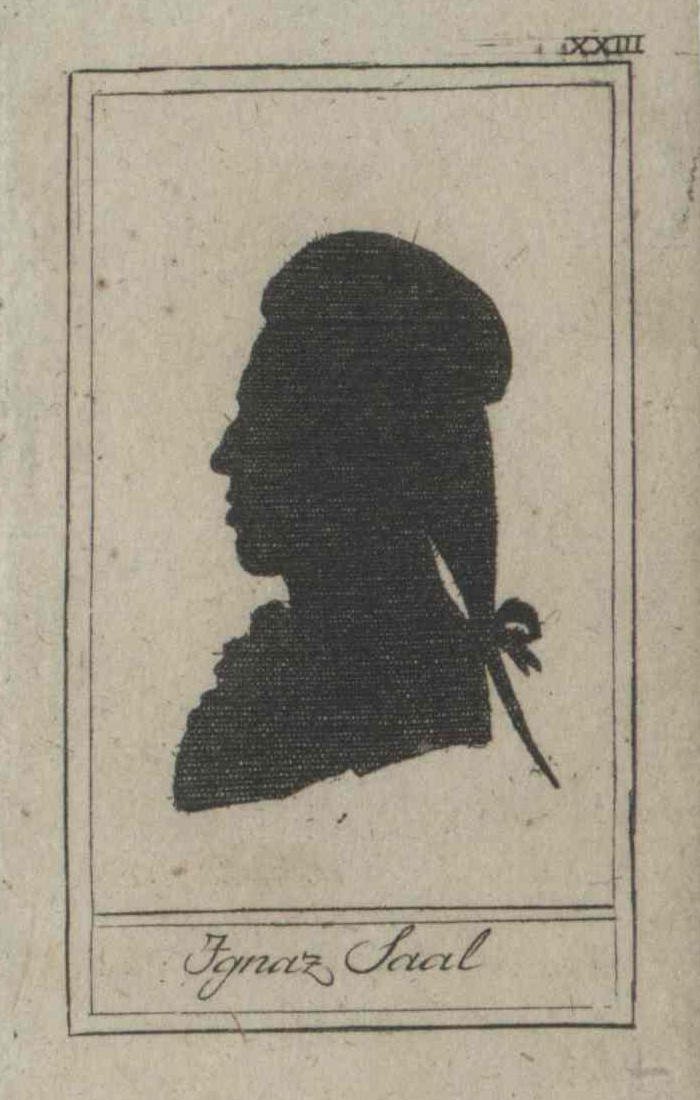
- Silhouette of Ignaz Saal
- Born: 26 July 1761; Geiselhöring, Germany
- Died: 30 October 1836 (aged 75); Vienna
- Occupations: Operatic bass; Actor
- Organizations: Imperial court opera, Vienna; Wiener Hofmusikkapelle

Ignaz Saal (26 July 1761 – 30 October 1836) was an operatic bass and comedian. He was for decades a member of the Imperial Court Theatre in Vienna. Saal performed the bass parts in the world premieres of Haydn's oratorios Die Schöpfung and Die Jahreszeiten, and appeared as Don Fernando in the premiere of Beethovens Fidelio on 23 May 1814 at the court theatre.

== Life ==
Born in Geiselhöring, Germany, Saal received musical instructions in voice and instruments early. He ended 1777 as seminarist of the Domus Gregoriana at the Churfürstliches Gymnasium in Munich (today Wilhelmsgymnasium). The same year, he made his debut at the theatre in Munich at the age of 16, and went to Pressburg in 1781. In Salzburg, he had contact to Leopold Mozart and Michael Haydn. From 1 March 1782 to 30 November 1821, Saal was a member of the Viennese imperial court theatre and bore the title K. k. Hofschauspieler. He performed leading roles of the German and Italian repertoire, including Almaviva in Mozart's Le nozze di Figaro and Sarastro in Die Zauberflöte. In addition he belonged to the ensemble of the Wiener Hofmusikkapelle from 1 July 1795.

He sang in the world premieres of Haydn's oratorios Die Schöpfung on 29 and 30 April 1798 and Die Jahreszeiten on 24 April 1801. He appeared as the minister Don Fernando in the premiere of the final version of Beethoven's opera, then called Fidelio, on 23 May 1814 at the court theatre.

His last residence was located on Brandstätte No. 632 in Vienna, where he died at the age of 75 from a stroke.

== Family ==
Saal's wife was the singer and actress Anna Maria Saal (1762–1808). Their daughter Therese Saal (1782–1855) was also a member of the court theatre from 1801 to 1805 and later married the art collector Franz Gawet (1765–1847). His son Franz Saal (c. 1782–1862) belonged to the court theatres from 1808 to 1811 and last worked in Brno.
