= List of operas by Luigi Cherubini =

This is a list of operas by Luigi Cherubini (1760–1842) who spent much of his working life in France.

In terms of genre, Cherubini's output included 11 opere serie and 10 opéras comiques, as well as three intermezzi, three tragédies lyriques, two opere buffe, and one each of the following: comédie héroïque, comédie lyrique, comédie mêlée d'ariettes, drame lyrique, dramma lirico, opéra bouffon, and opéra-ballet.

== List of operas ==
Operas by Luigi Cherubini
Title	Genre	Acts	Libretto	Premiere	
Title	Genre	Acts	Libretto	Date	Venue
Amore artigiano	intermezzo	unknown	after Carlo Goldoni	22 October 1773	Fiesole, Teatro San Domenico
Il giocatore	intermezzo	unknown	librettist unknown and score lost	composed 1775?	Florence
(untitled)	intermezzo	unknown	librettist unknown	16 February 1778	Florence, Serviti
Il Quinto Fabio	opera seria	3 acts	Apostolo Zeno	Autumn 1779	Alessandria, Teatro Paglia
Armida abbandonata	opera seria	3 acts	Bartolomeo Vitturi, based on Torquato Tasso's Gerusalemme liberata	25 January 1782	Florence, La Pergola
Adriano in Siria	opera seria	3 acts	Metastasio	16 April 1782	Livorno, Teatro Armeni
Mesenzio, re d'Etruria	opera seria	3 acts	Ferdinando Casor(r)i	6 September 1782	Florence, Teatro della Pergola
Il Quinto Fabio (second version)	opera seria	3 acts	Apostolo Zeno	January 1783	Rome, Teatro Argentina
Lo sposo di tre e marito di nessuna	opera buffa	2 acts	Filippo Livigni	November 1783	Venice, Teatro San Samuele
Olimpiade	opera seria	3 acts?	Metastasio	1783	Venice?
L'Alessandro nelle Indie	opera seria	2 acts	Metastasio	April 1784	Mantua, Teatro Nuovo Regio Ducale
L'Idalide	opera seria	2 acts	Ferdinando Moretti	26 December 1784	Florence, Teatro della Pergola
Demetrio	opera seria	4 pieces only	Metastasio	1785	London, King's Theatre
La finta principessa	opera buffa	2 acts	Filippo Livigni	2 April 1785	London, King's Theatre
Il Giulio Sabino	opera seria	2 acts	Pietro Giovannini	30 March 1786	London, King's Theatre
Ifigenia in Aulide	opera seria	3 acts	Ferdinando Moretti, after François Louis Gaud Lebland Du Roullet	12 January 1788	Turin, Teatro Regio
Démophoon	tragédie lyrique	3 acts	Jean-François Marmontel, after Metastasio	2 December 1788	Paris, Opéra (Porte Saint-Martin)
Lodoïska	comédie héroïque	3 acts	Claude-François Fillette-Loraux after Les Amours du Chevalier Faublas by Jean-Baptiste Louvet de Couvrais	18 July 1791	Paris, Théâtre Feydeau
Koukourgi (composed 1792-93)	opéra comique	3 acts	Honoré-Nicolas-Marie Duveyrier	18 September 2010	Klagenfurt, Stadttheater Klagenfurt
Le congrès des rois (together with Henri Montan Berton, Frédéric Blasius, Nicolas Dalayrac, Prosper-Didier Deshayes, François Devienne, André Grétry, Louis-Emmanuel Jadin, Rodolphe Kreutzer, Étienne Méhul, Jean-Pierre Solié and Armand-Emmanuel Trial)	comédie mêlée d'ariettes	3 acts	Desmaillot (Antoine-François Eve)	26 February 1794	Paris, Opéra-Comique (Favart)
Eliza, ou Le voyage aux glaciers du Mont Saint Bernard	opéra comique	2 acts	Jacques-Antoine Révérony de Saint-Cyr	13 December 1794	Paris, Théâtre Feydeau
Médée	opéra comique	3 acts	François-Benoît Hoffmann and Nicolas Étienne Framéry, after Euripides and Pierre Corneille	first version: 13 March 1797	Paris, Théâtre Feydeau
L'hôtellerie portugaise	opéra comique	1 act	Etienne Saint-Aignan	25 July 1798	Paris, Théâtre Feydeau
La punition	opéra comique	1 act	Jean-Louis Brousse Desfaucheres	23 February 1799	Paris, Théâtre Feydeau
Emma ou La prisionnière (composed together with François-Adrien Boieldieu)	opéra comique	1 act	Etienne de Jouy, Charles de Longchamps and Claude Godard d'Aucort de Saint-Just	12 September 1799	Paris, Théâtre Montansier
Les deux journées, ou Le porteur d'eau	comédie lyrique	3 acts	Jean-Nicolas Bouilly	16 January 1800	Paris, Théâtre Feydeau
Épicure (with Étienne Méhul)	opéra comique	3 acts, revised as 2 acts	Charles-Albert Desmoustier	14 March 1800	Paris, Opéra-Comique (Favart)
Anacréon ou L'amour fugitif	opéra-ballet	2 acts	C. R. Mendouze	4 October 1803	Paris, Opéra (Théâtre des Arts)
Faniska	opéra comique	3 acts	Joseph von Sonnleitner after René Charles Guilbert de Pixérécourt	25 February 1806	Vienna, Theater am Kärntnertor
Pimmalione	dramma lirico	1 act	Stefano Vestris, after Antonio Simone Sografi's Italian version of Pygmalion by Jean-Jacques Rousseau	30 November 1809	Paris, Théâtre des Tuileries
Le crescendo	opéra bouffon	1 act	Charles-Augustine de Bassompierre de Sewrin	1 September 1810	Paris, Opéra-Comique (Feydeau)
Les Abencérages, ou L'étendard de Grenade	tragédie lyrique	3 acts	Victor-Joseph Étienne de Jouy, after François-René de Chateaubriand, based on Jean-Pierre Claris de Florian's novel Gonsalve de Cordoue	6 April 1813	Paris, Opéra (Théâtre des Arts)
Bayard à Mézières (in collaboration with François-Adrien Boieldieu, Nicolas Isouard and Charles-Simon Catel)	opéra comique	1 act	Emmanuel Dupaty and René de Chazet	12 February 1814	Paris, Opéra-Comique (Feydeau)
Blanche de Provence, ou La cour de fées (composed with Henri Montan Berton, François-Adrien Boieldieu, Rodolphe Kreutzer and Ferdinando Paer)	opéra comique	3 acts	Emmanuel Théaulon and Armand Jean Le Bouthillier de Rancé	1 May 1821	Paris, Théâtre des Tuileries
La marquise de Brinvilliers (composed in collaboration with Daniel Auber, Désiré-Alexandre Batton, Henri Montan Berton, Felice Blangini, François-Adrien Boieldieu, Michele Carafa, Ferdinand Hérold and Ferdinando Paer)	drame lyrique	3 acts	Eugène Scribe and Castil-Blaze (François-Henri-Joseph Blaze)	31 October 1831	Paris, Opéra-Comique (Ventadour)
Ali Baba, ou Les quarante voleurs	tragédie lyrique	Prologue and 4 acts	Eugène Scribe and Mélesville	22 July 1833	Paris, Opéra (Salle Le Peletier)
