= Duveyrier =

The name Duveyrier can refer to three people:

- Honoré-Nicolas-Marie Duveyrier (1753–1839), politician, judge and playwright, father of
- Anne-Honoré-Joseph Duveyrier de Mélésville (1787–1865), French writer/dramatist, author of the play Catherine, ou La Croix d'or.
- Henri Duveyrier (1840–1892), French explorer of the Sahara
