= Koukourgi =

- Opéra comique by Luigi Cherubini
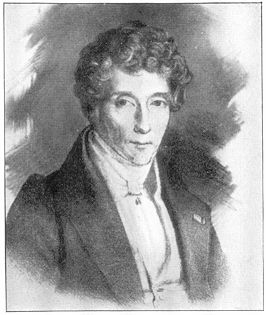
- Luigi Cherubini
- Librettist: Mélesville père
- Language: French

Koukourgi is a 1792 French-language comic opera by Luigi Cherubini to a libretto by Mélesville père, which was not performed in Cherubini's lifetime. The music was laid up for nearly forty years till four numbers were re-used in Ali Baba; ou, les Quarante Voleurs of 1833, to a libretto by Mélesville fils, Eugène Scribe, and with additional new music by the then elderly Cherubini. The opera was reconstructed and premiered in celebration of the composer's 250th anniversary at the Stadttheater Klagenfurt in 2010.

== Recording ==
- DVD sung in French, with dialogues in German : Stefan Cerny, Cigdem Soyarslan, Leonardo Galeazzi, Daniel Prohaska, Peter Edelmann, Kärtner Sinfonieorchester, Peter Marschik, directed Josef E. Köpplinger. Arthaus Musik, 2010
