= Overture in G major (Cherubini) =

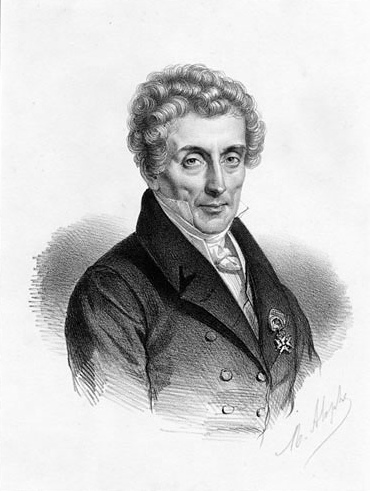
Luigi Cherubini, lithograph by Marie Alexandre Alophe

The Overture in G major by Luigi Cherubini is an orchestral work written for concert use in early 1815. It is unusual among Cherubini's overtures in that his other, better known overtures (such as those to Anacreon, Médée, Les deux journées and Ali Baba), were intended to introduce stage works. Although born in Italy Cherubini had been living in France since 1784, and had earned world fame through a series of operas composed for the Paris stage. In the first decade of the nineteenth century the vogue for his dramatic works began to wane, and he turned increasingly to sacred music.

== Description ==
Cherubini composed the Overture in G major on commission from the Royal Philharmonic Society in London, which had engaged him to conduct a series of concerts in the spring of 1815 and asked him to provide three new works for the programs: an overture, a symphony and a cantata. Cherubini began the composition of the overture in Paris in February and finished the score in London the following month. He conducted the premiere on April 3, and the work enjoyed a warm reception. By contrast, Cherubini’s new Symphony in D major, unveiled some weeks later, proved a decisive failure. The irony is that today the Symphony is heard with some frequency (several recordings have long been available) while the overture remains formidably obscure.

The Overture in G major has, however, a full measure of the dramatic atmosphere that characterizes his opera overtures. Indeed, after the stately opening gestures of its Larghetto introduction, an undercurrent of unease becomes apparent, conveyed by chromatic twists in the bass, and by an early turn from G into E♭, which mixes G-minor vocabulary into the major-mode context. Strings are muted throughout the introduction. As foreshadowed, a fiery G minor Allegro spiritoso soon appears, bristling with energy, although the main theme is somewhat formulaic. The formidable quality of Cherubini’s mind, however, may be savored in an elegant contrapuntal woodwind interplay that prepares the theme’s counterstatement:

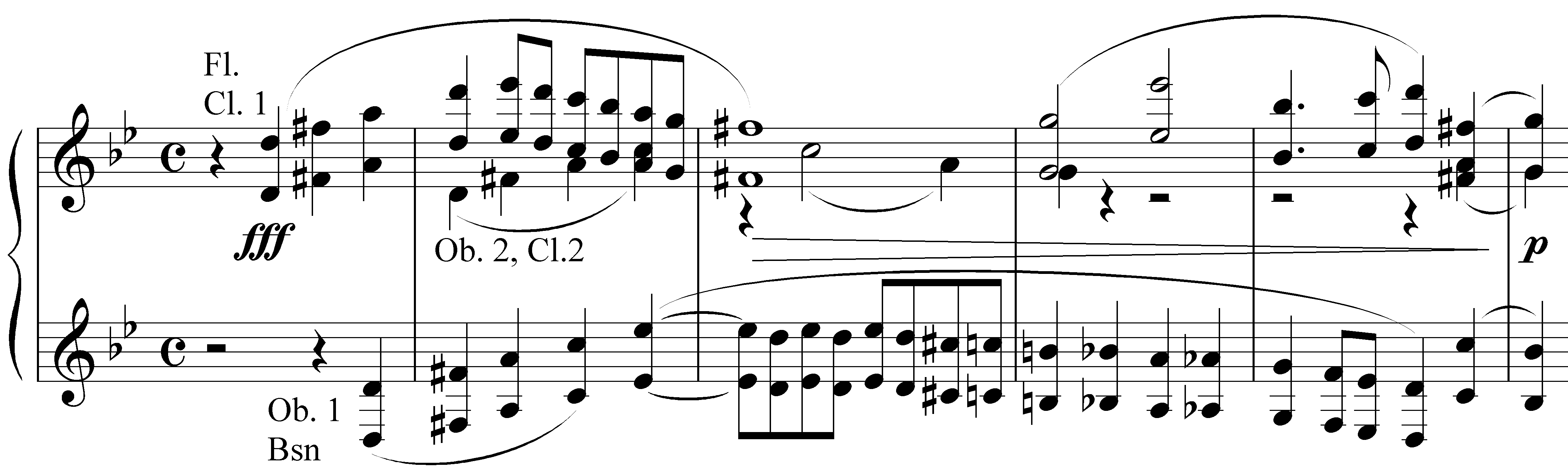

Following a dramatic climax, a transition passage promises a second subject in B♭ major. But Cherubini sidesteps with a chorale-like string theme in warm, distant D♭ major:

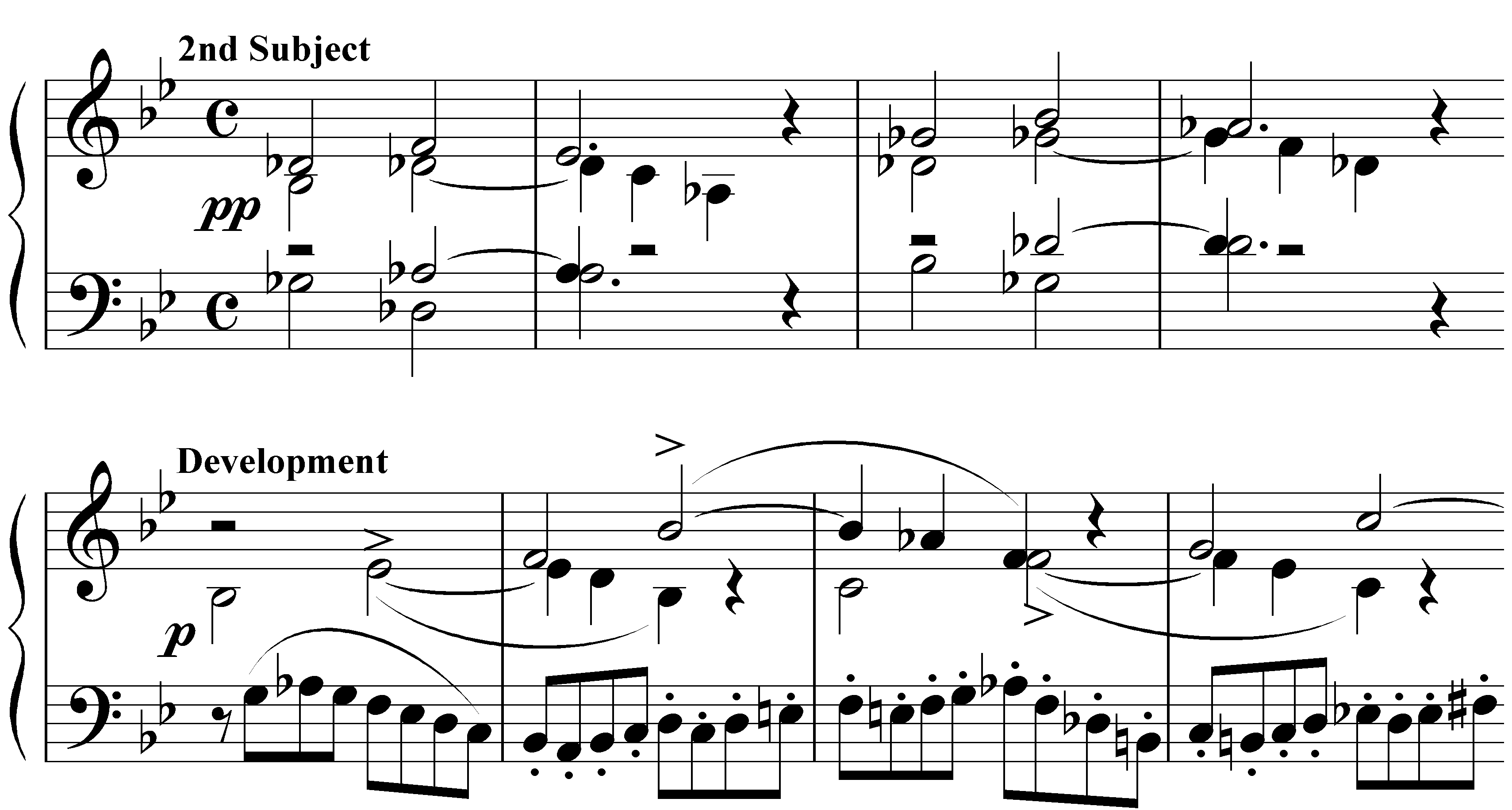

A flowing B♭ major theme follows, and after a triumphant exposition close, the development begins with a passage that transforms the chorale into new theme (see example), delivered by antiphonal horns against pattering bassoons. The development section is pithy and brief. In the reprise, Cherubini discards the exposition's sidestepping modulation as a twice-told tale, and, moreover, replaces the initial second-subject theme with the quoted development variant. A presto coda begins with what is in effect an aristocratic forebear of a Rossini-crescendo, building from pianissimo to fortissimo, and bold reminders of G minor punctuate before the overture ends in triumph.
