= Jules-Martial Regnault de Prémaray =

French author

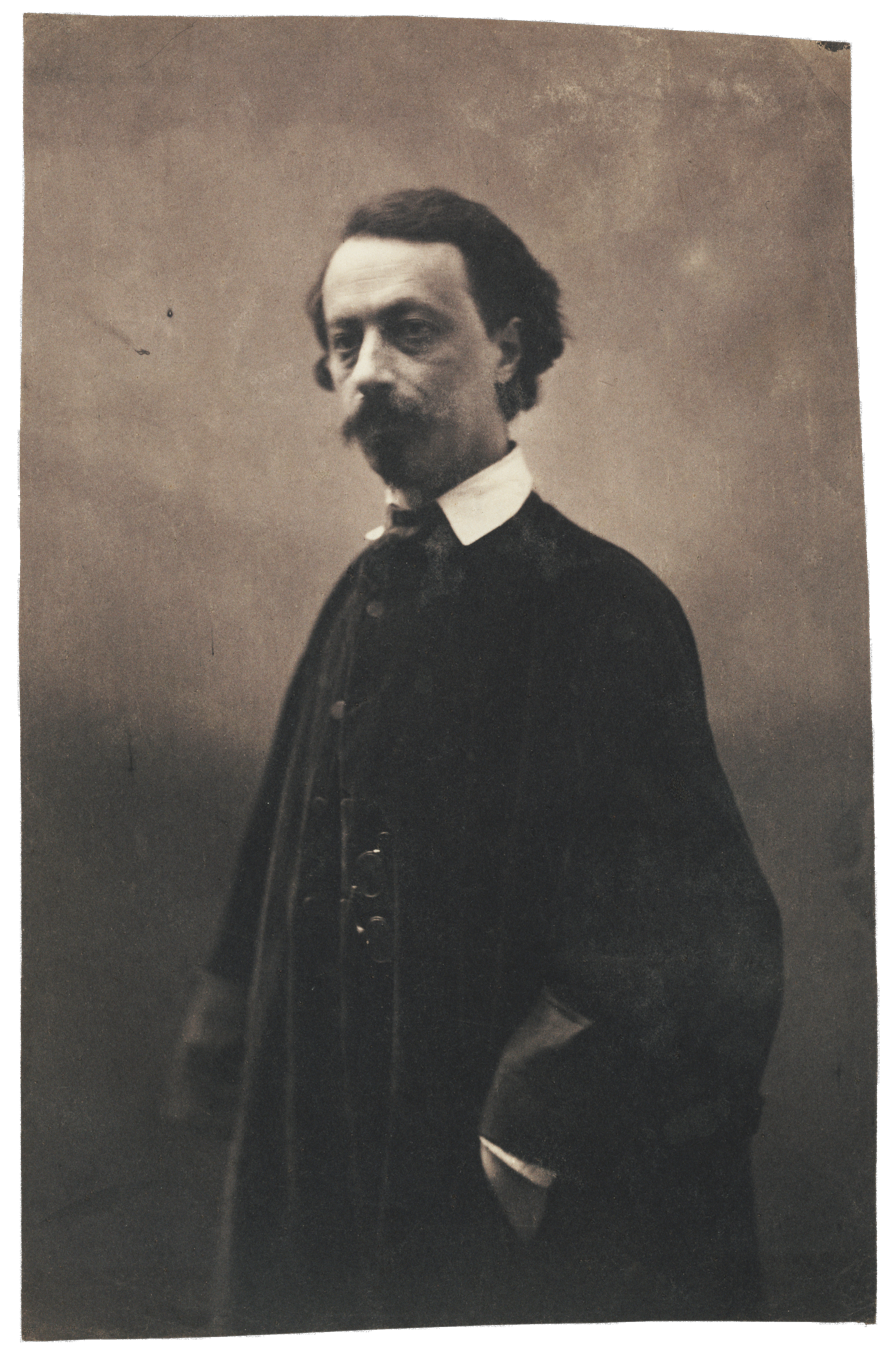
Prémaray by Nadar, 1857

Jules-Martial Regnault de Prémaray (11 June 1819 in Pont-d'Armes Loire-Atlantique – 11 June 1868) was a French author. He was literary editor (and then, from 1848, chief editor) of la Patrie. He published several poems, dramas and vaudevilles.

== Theatre ==
- Le Cabaret de la veuve, vaudeville in 1 act, with Léon Paillet, Paris, Théâtre Saint-Marcel, 20 April 1841
- Le Docteur Robin, comédie en vaudevilles in 1 act, Paris, Théâtre du Gymnase-Dramatique, 21 October 1842
- La Marquise de Rantzau, ou la Nouvelle Mariée, comedy in 2 acts, mixed with distincts, Paris, Théâtre du Gymnase-Dramatique, 13 December 1842
- Bertrand l'horloger, ou le Père Job, comédie en vaudevilles in 2 acts, Paris, Théâtre du Gymnase-Dramatique, 3 March 1843
- Les Deux favorites, ou l'Anneau du Roi, comédie en vaudevilles in 2 acts, Paris, Théâtre du Gymnase-Dramatique, 18 April 1843
- Le Capitaine Lambert, comédie en vaudevilles in 2 acts, Paris, Théâtre du Gymnase-Dramatique, 23 octobre 1843 [unpublished]
- Manon, ou Un épisode de la Fronde, comédie en vaudevilles in 2 acts, Paris, Théâtre du Gymnase-Dramatique, 24 November 1843
- Part à deux, comedy en 1 act, mixed with songs, Paris, Théâtre Beaumarchais, 15 May 1844
- Sarah Walter, comédie en vaudevilles in 2 acts, Paris, Théâtre du Gymnase-Dramatique, 14 June 1844 [unpublished]
- Le Tailleur de la Place Royale, drama in 3 acts preceded by a prologue titled La Taverne du Pas de la Mule, Paris, Théâtre Beaumarchais, 11 July 1844
- La Comtesse de Moranges, drama-vaudeville in 3 acts, Paris, Théâtre Beaumarchais, 7 November 1845
- Une femme laide, comedy in 2 acts mixed with a song, Paris, Théâtre du Palais-Royal, 16 December 1845
- Simplice, ou le Collégien en vacances, vaudeville in 1 act, with Narcisse Fournier, Paris, Théâtre du Gymnase dramatique, 22 November 1846
- Le Chevalier de Saint-Remy, drama in 5 acts and 6 tableaux, with Antoine-François Varner, Paris, Théâtre de la Gaité, 22 June 1847
- L'Ordonnance du médecin, comédie en vaudevilles in 1 act, Paris, Théâtre du Palais-Royal, 29 Octobre 1847
- Le Jour de charité, vaudeville in 1 act, Paris, Théâtre des Délassements-Comiques, 7 June 1850
- La Peau de mon oncle, vaudeville in 1 act, with Charles Varin, Paris, Théâtre Montansier, 20 August 1850
- L'Amant de cœur, vaudeville in 1 act, with Paul Siraudin, Paris, Théâtre Montansier, 17 July 1851
- Les Droits de l'homme, comedy in 2 acts in prose, Paris, Théâtre de l'Odéon, 5 November 1851
- Monsieur le Vicomte, comédie en vaudevilles in 2 acts, with Eugène Nyon, Paris, Théâtre des Variétés, 10 January 1853
- Les Cœurs d'or, comedy in 3 acts, mixed with a song, with Léon Laya and Amédée Achard, Paris, Théâtre du Gymnase, 15 July 1854
- Donnez aux pauvres, comedy in 2 acts and in prose, Paris, Théâtre de l'Odéon, 1 February 1855
- La Boulangère a des écus, drama in 5 acts and 6 tableaux, Paris, Théâtre de la Porte-Saint-Martin, 24 November 1855 Texte en ligne
- La Jeunesse de Grammont, comedy in 1 act, in prose, Paris, Théâtre de l'Odéon, 5 February 1862

Varia

- Les Cendres de Napoléon, ode à Mgr le prince de Joinville, 1840
- Les Proverbes menteurs, published as a serial in La Patrie, 1850-1853
- Le Chemin des écoliers, novel in 3 acts (and in prose), proverbe, 1853
- Promenades sentimentales dans Londres et le Palais de cristal, lettres de Londres au journal La Patrie, 1851
- Rien, chroniques du monde et du théâtre, 1861

== Sources ==
- Gustave Vapereau, Dictionnaire universel des littératures, Paris, Hachette, 1876, p. 1209
- Joseph Marie Quérard, La France littéraire, Paris : L'Éditeur, 1859-1864, t. XII, p. 36-39
- Jules Brisson et Félix Ribeyre, Les Grands Journaux de France, Paris : Dumineray, 1863, p. 95-98
