= Léon Laya =

French playwright

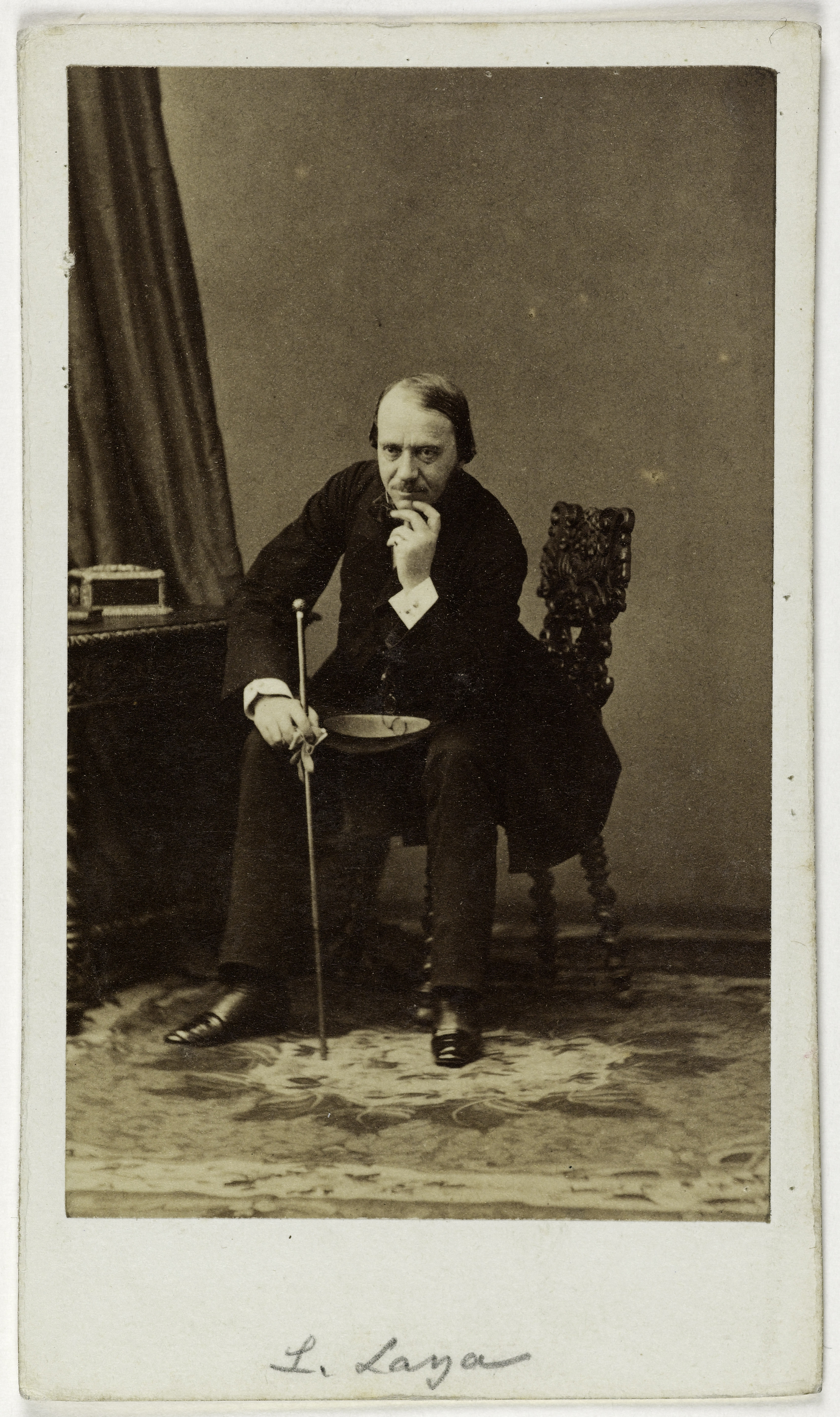
Image of Laya Léon

Léon Laya (c.1810 in Paris – 5 September 1872 in Paris) was a 19th-century French playwright. The académicien Jean-Louis Laya was his father.

Léon Laya was the author of a number of successful comedies, alternating between the delicacy or purity of the idea and the vivacity of the form : Une Maîtresse anonyme, in 2 acts (1812) ; la Peau du lion, in 2 acts (1814) ; les Cœurs d’or, in 3 acts, with Prémaray (Gymnase, 1854) ; les Jeunes gens, in 3 acts, free and independent adaptation of Terence's Adelphoe (Théâtre-Français, 1855) ; le duc Job, in 4 acts, one of the most sustained successes of the Théâtre-Français (1859) ; la Loi du cœur (Théâtre-Français, 1862), etc.

== Theatre ==
- Le Docteur du défunt, comédie-vaudeville in 1 act, with W. Lafontaine and Pierre Carmouche, Paris, Théâtre du Vaudeville, 28 June 1825
- Le Dandy, comedy in 2 acts, mingled with songs, with Jacques-François Ancelot, Paris, Théâtre du Vaudeville, 15 October 1832 Text online
- La Robe de chambre, ou les Mœurs de ce temps-là, comedy in 1 act mingled with songs, with Jacques-François Ancelot, Paris, Théâtre du Vaudeville, 10 June 1833
- Le Poltron, comedy en 1 act, with Jean-François Bayard, Charles Potron and Alphonse Gauthier, Paris, Théâtre du Vaudeville, 9 October 1835
- La Liste de mes maîtresses, comedy in 1 act, mingled with couplets, with Charles Potron, Paris, Théâtre du Palais-Royal, 26 January 1838
- La Lionne, comedy in 2 acts, mingled with song, with Jacques-François Ancelot, Paris, Théâtre du Vaudeville, 14 February 1840
- Le Hochet d'une coquette, comedy in 1 act, Paris, Théâtre des Variétés, 13 July 1840
- L'Œil de verre, comedy in 1 act, mingled with song chant, Paris, Théâtre du Vaudeville, 15 September 1840
- Je connais les femmes ! comedy in 1 act, mingled with song, Paris, Théâtre du Palais-Royal, 14 November 1840
- L'Esclave à Paris, comédie anecdotique in 1 act, mingled with couplets, with Pierre Carmouche, Paris, Théâtre des Folies-Dramatiques, 5 March 1841
- Un Mari du bon temps, comedy in 1 act, mingled with song, Paris, Gymnase-Dramatique, 14 August 1841
- Le Premier Chapitre, comedy in 1 act, mingled with song, Paris, Gymnase-Dramatique, 11 July 1842
- Une maîtresse anonyme, comedy in 2 acts, mingled with song, Paris, Théâtre du Palais-Royal, 8 October 1842
- Le Portrait vivant, comedy in 3 acts, with Mélesville, Paris, Théâtre-Français, 17 October 1842
- La Peau du lion, comedy in 2 acts, mingled with song, Paris, Théâtre du Palais-Royal, 3 April 1844
- L'Étourneau, comedy in 3 acts, mingled with couplets, with Jean-François Bayard, Paris, Théâtre du Palais-Royal, 7 September 1844
- Emma, ou Un ange gardien, comedy in 3 acts, mingled with song, Paris, Gymnase-Dramatique, 28 October 1844
- Un poisson d'avril, comedy in 1 act, mingled with couplets, Paris, Théâtre du Palais-Royal, 1 April 1845
- Georges et Maurice, comédie vaudeville in 2 acts, with Jean-François Bayard, Paris, Théâtre du Gymnase, 21 February 1846
- Les Demoiselles de noce, comédie-vaudeville en 2 actes, avec Jean-François Bayard, Paris, Gymnase-Dramatique, 31 October 1846
- Un coup de lansquenet, comedy in 2 acts, in prose, Paris, Théâtre-Français, 30 January 1847
- La Recherche de l'inconnu, comédie-vaudeville in 2 acts, Paris, Théâtre du Palais-Royal, 8 October 1847
- Léonie, drama in 1 act, mingled with songs, Paris, Gymnase-Dramatique, 24 January 1848
- Rage d'amour, ou la Femme d'un ami, vaudeville in 1 act, with Jean-François Bayard, Paris, Théâtre du Gymnase, 22 December 1848
- Le Groom, comedy mingled with couplets, with Jean-François Bayard, Paris, Théâtre de l'Odéon, 21 August 1849
- Deux Vieux Papillons, comedy in 1 act, mingled withcouplets, Paris, Théâtre de l'Odéon, 2 March 1850
- Le Prince Ajax, comedy in 2 acts, mingled with song, Paris, Théâtre du Palais-Royal, 10 February 1852
- Les Cœurs d'or, comedy in 3 acts, mingled with song, with Jules de Prémaray and Amédée Achard, Paris, Théâtre du Gymnase, 15 July 1854
- Les Jeunes gens, comedy in 3 acts, Paris, Théâtre-Français, 10 March 1855
- Les Pauvres d'esprit, comedy in 3 acts, in prose, Paris, Théâtre-Français, 27 November 1856
- Le Duc Job, comedy in 4 acts and in prose, Paris, Théâtre-Français, 4 November 1859
- La Loi du cœur, comedy in 3 acts, in prose, Paris, Théâtre-Français, 6 March 1862
- Madame Desroches, comedy in 4 acts, in prose, Paris, Théâtre-Français, 18 December 1867
- La Gueule du loup, comedy in 4 acts, in prose, Paris, Théâtre du Gymnase, 16 October 1872

== Sources ==
- Gustave Vapereau, Dictionnaire universel des littératures, Paris, Hachette, 1876, p. 1209
