= French theatre of the late 18th century =

The French theatre of the late 18th century functioned as a forum for political expression and debate; during this period, society and art became highly politicised. The French took great national pride in their theatres. A report commissioned by the Commune of Paris in 1789 declared Paris to be a centre for the "foremost theatres of Europe" that served as an "exemplar for foreigners." An audience's response to the play was important to its success—if a play was received poorly (claques), rather than favourably (cabales), the play would not receive royalty payments.

== Theatre of the Ancien Régime ==
Before the creation of the National Assembly in 1789, the monarchy supported only three theatres in Paris: the Académie Royale de Musique (Paris Opera), the Comédie-Italienne, and the Comédie-Française. Royal patronage resulted in a monopoly over the theatre and safeguarded the monarch from mockery and criticism. It was not until the late 1780s that this system was criticised for preventing the success and freedom enjoyed by theatres elsewhere.

The government of the Ancien Régime attempted to silence a growing political unrest. In an attempt to rid society of the disruption caused by "honnêtes hommes," the lieutenant-general of police, Marc-Pierre de Voyer de Paulmy d'Argenson, tried to control the behaviour of spectators in theatres. This resulted in a temporary lull in politicised drama. Nearly all of the top fifty plays of the decade had nothing to do with the Revolution and were uncritical and silent about the revolutionary ideals of liberty.

== The Chapelier Law of 1791 ==
With the introduction of the Chapelier Law in 1791, the National Assembly instituted the freedom of theatres, which could now function without governmental interference or censorship. A dramatic increase in the number of theatres followed, from fourteen in Paris in 1791 to thirty-five in 1792. As a result of the law, the censor now expressed not the absolute will of the monarch but the more negotiable, democratic preferences of the nation.

== The parterre ==
The physical space of a theatre in France during the Enlightenment allowed a large number of people to attend. With capacities of up to two thousand audience members, the theatre was an important arena for the French community. During this time, nearly fifty new theatres opened, over one thousand plays were written, and approximately twenty-four plays were performed on a daily basis. Giving the working class access to the theatre meant opening it to their demands. Ravel calls the pit the "parterre", where the working class could participate in the performance by voicing their reactions in an unmediated, sometimes aggressive way, thus anticipating in some form the coming Revolution. This group embodied the revolutionary spirit for direct democracy and subsequently became an important political actor, confounding the hierarchies of royal authority.

== Pieces de circonstances ==
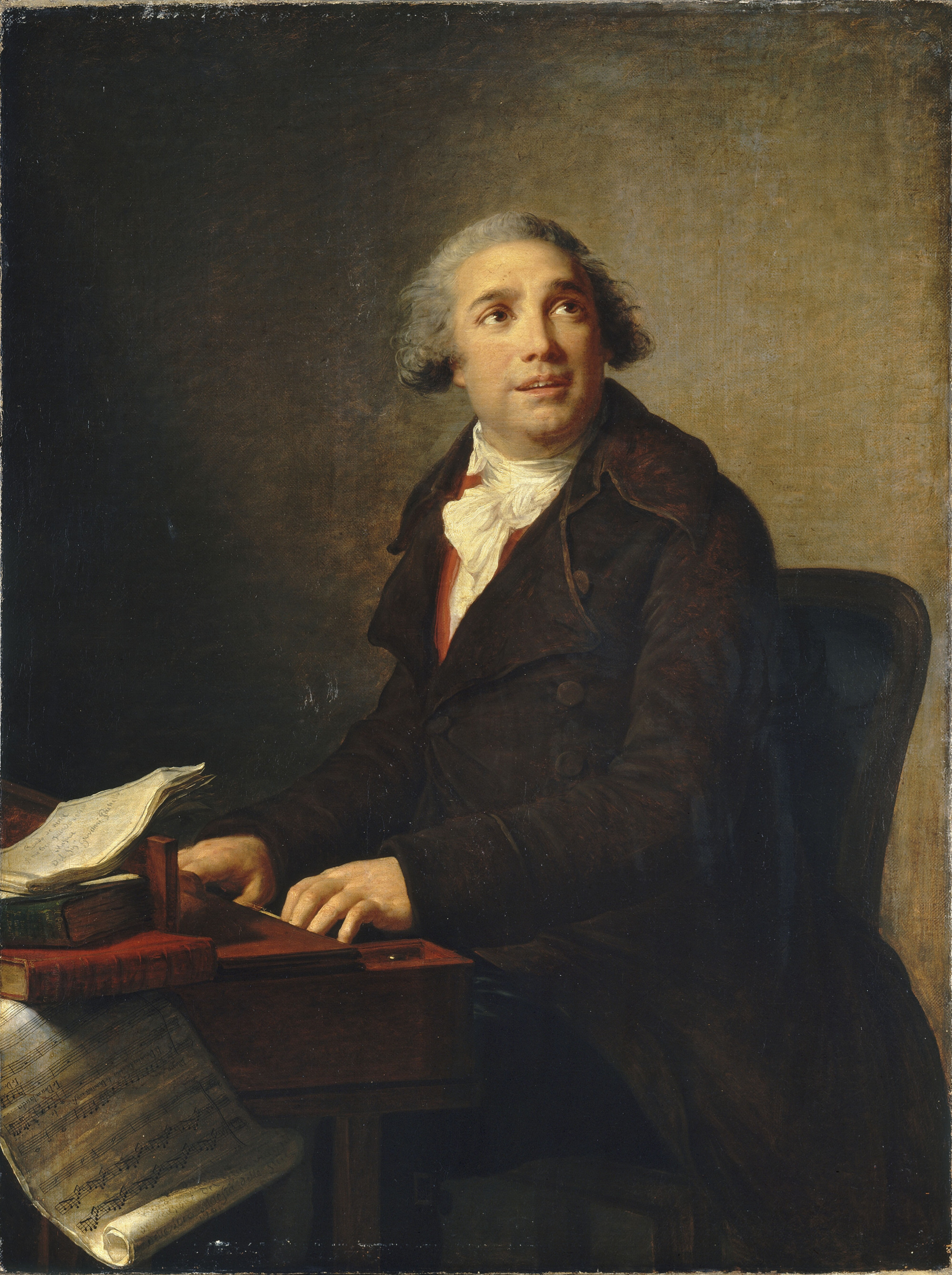
Paisello Vigee Le Brun

A Parisian citizen during the Enlightenment may have attended the theatre principally for two reasons: firstly, its aesthetic value as an awe-inspiring spectacle and secondly, because of its political suggestiveness. When drama lacked this latter aspect, it was criticised for distracting audiences from the pressing public political issues of the time. For example, a petition was sent to the National Assembly regarding Paisiello's flashy opera Nina, osia la pazza d'amore, because it lacked political and educational meaning. This resulted in the opera's closure in 1792 and the National Assembly banned theatre that did not incorporate the events of the Revolution.

French theatre became full of "pieces de circonstance," or "works of social circumstances," particularly where the events of the military were concerned. For example, in December 1793, a member of the Committee of Public Safety, Bertrand Barère, demanded that playwrights create work about the French capture of Toulon. Seven new plays were subsequently written about the battle, including La prise de Toulon, which made direct references to political leaders and philosophers. Aubin-Louis Millin de Grandmaison claimed that "tragedy should teach great political truths and public virtues. If they want to express a powerful idea, tragic authors are therefore obliged to torment their genius, to cloak their idea with a veil of allegory"

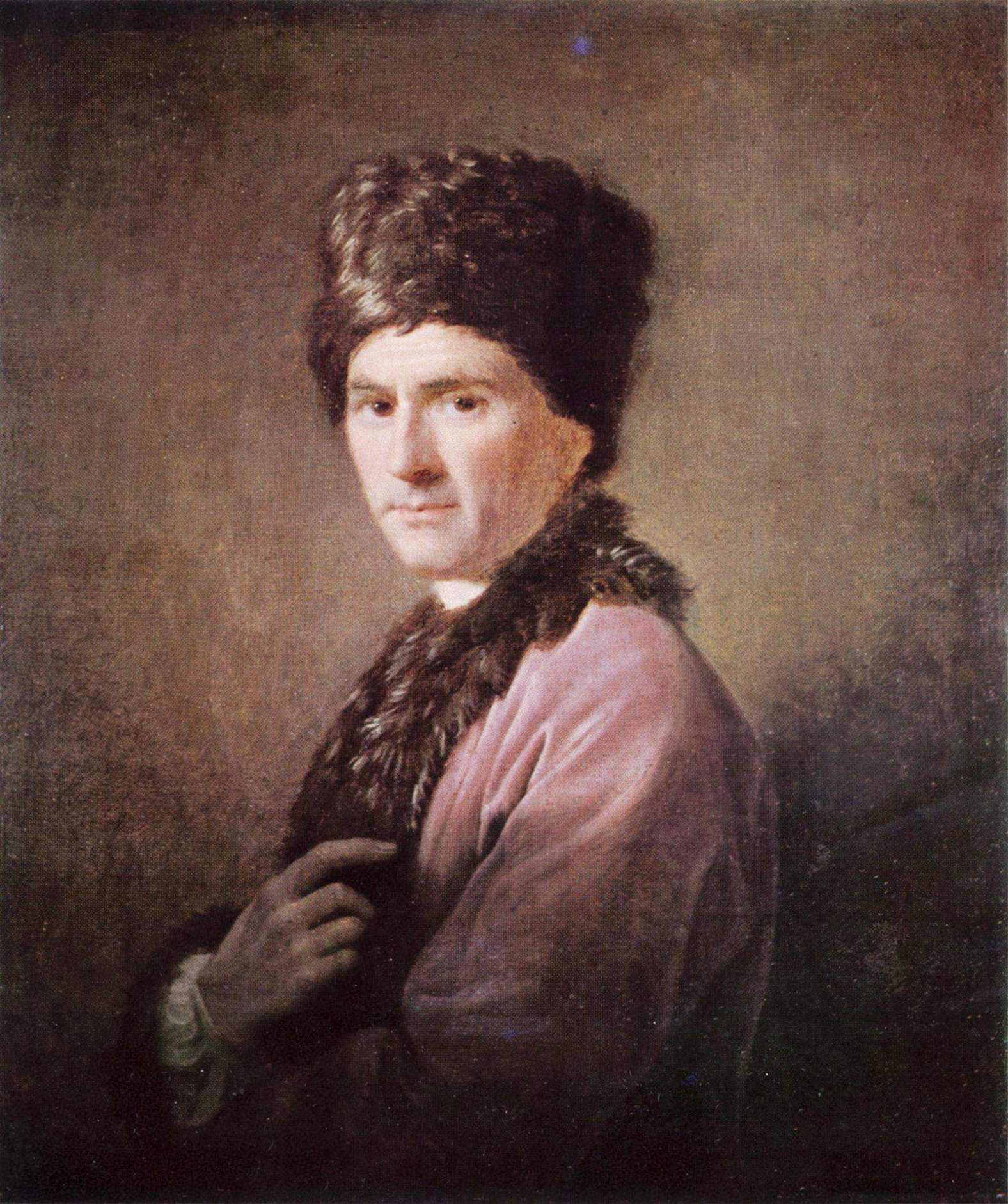
Jean-Jacques Rousseau

While French theatre was praised for its ability to engage in the political debates of its time, it was also criticised by members of the aristocracy for corrupting the public sphere. A notable proponent of this notion was Jean-Jacques Rousseau, who, in his Letter to M. D'Alembert on Spectacles, argued that theatre could not improve the morality of the audience and instead could only re-inforce their existing beliefs. He was enraged by Molière's Le Misanthrope for the way it praised the hypocritical character Philinte at the expense of Alcest, the honest character in the play.

== Politics and the theatre ==
The worlds of politics and drama converged, since some leading playwrights of this period were also politicians. For example, tragedian Marie-Joseph Chénier belonged to the Paris Jacobins and was elected to the National Convention; Collot d'Herbois wrote both comedies and tragedies, while being an active member of the Committee for Public Safety; and interior minister François de Neufchâteau was also a popular playwright of the time.

Theatrics also played a large role in politics, in terms of the way political speeches and campaigns were carried out. Politicians of the time, such as the Marquis de Mirabeau, used the public's ability to be captivated by the theatre to arouse support for their regimes. In fact, in a production called Assemblée fédérative, citizens were allowed to pay to role-play as great speakers of the Enlightenment, re-enacting debates and speeches of propaganda. Inevitably, this situation resulted in a mockery of politics, and performances where actors played the parts of politicians were often controversial.

Along with the theatricality of politics, the role of drama in French society is reflected in the theatrical portrayal of the visions and beliefs of the National Convention regarding surveillance. The content of Revolutionary plays also reflected the beliefs of Jean Jacques Rousseau and the Age of Enlightenment. As described by Rousseau, surveillance provides the means through which the authenticity and goodness of the person can be constituted, recognized and affirmed. These ideas regarding surveillance resonated with Revolutionary culture, as there was a general push for complete visibility. The power of surveillance was thought to be shared by all citizens and was considered by many to be the single most important means to protect the Revolution from counter-revolutionary citizens and would-be usurpers.

Along with L’Époux républicain, plays such as Plus de bâtards en France, and La Veuve du républicain, ou, Le Calomniateur all reflected the Convention’s belief that surveillance in the private sphere was extremely important to the transparency of the Revolution. The Convention believed that citizens needed to police themselves and their peers, and then had a duty to report counterrevolutionaries. This was all encouraged in order to continue the safety and well-being of the Republic. Robespierre was particularly consumed with both the elimination of theatricality from the government and the elimination of the distance between the representatives and the people that they represented. Therefore, the aforementioned plays were encouraged and accepted.

L'Époux républicain was one play in particular that was enormously popular and very effective at portraying the importance of the acceptance of surveillance. The main character’s wife, Mélisse, has an affair and is also revealed to be counter-revolutionary, showing the link between immoral activity and treason. There were also characters within these plays that questioned whether or not surveillance was ethical or warranted. However, the characters that endorsed this surveillance were the ones that the plays portrayed as the moral, just, and ultimately correct citizens. Revolutionary drama depicted domestic life as inherently connected to political life, which in turn linked the practice of surveillance to the protection of the Revolution. Theater was considered a machine for propaganda to further the beliefs and ideals of the Revolution and its leaders.

Alternatively, there were plays that provided a critique of surveillance, such as La Chaste Suzanne, a play which actually caused riots because of supposed counter-revolutionary messages. La Chaste Suzanne cast an unfavorable light on two elected officials engaged in the surveillance of the main character, Suzanne, during a private moment in a bath. The officials attempt to extort sexual favors from Suzanne and when she refuses, they denounce her and allege that she was having an affair with a young man. Suzanne is brought to trial for adultery and is almost stoned to death before a sympathetic lawyer comes to her rescue and reveals the nefarious plot. This play represented a rejection of the ideas of surveillance encouraged by the government and society (embodied by the spying officials invading Suzanne’s privacy), and was thus seen as counter-revolutionary. The play was staged in a very momentous time in Revolutionary history - King Louis XVI had recently been tried and executed and the lines separating the Jacobin and Girondin values began to widen and cause animosity.

Due to the atmosphere of the Terror, and the subject matter of the play, riots began to break out condemning the performance. Even one of the actors in the play wrote a letter detailing citizens’ disgruntled reactions in the crowd upon hearing certain lines of the play they believed associated the play’s heroine, Suzanne, with Marie Antoinette. Patriots showed their discontent with the counter-revolutionary ideas in the play by storming the stage with drawn swords and threatening to turn the theatre into a hospital if they play continued. The Convention voted to ban La Chaste Suzanne after complaints that it disrupted the public order and was morally corrupt. Shortly after it was banned, on September 27, 1793, Pierre-Yves Barré, one of those responsible for the staging the performance and several actors and writers including the Radet and Desfontaines-Lavallée, were arrested for staging plays filled with "perfidious allusions".

In addressing the National Assembly in early 1791, the aforementioned Mirabeau declared that "when the time comes for us to concern ourselves with the education of the masses, in which the theatre must play its part, it will be seen that drama can be transformed into a very active, very rigorous morality."

As Mirabeau’s declaration suggests, the revolutionary governments used theatre to promote republican ideology and morality. According to F. W. J. Hemmings, in the plays produced in Paris between 1793 and 1794, over two-thirds conveyed a political message. However, the question of what constituted a drama that espoused proper political messages and appropriate republican morals ultimately fell to the government. Consequently, in its efforts to utilize the theatre for political ends, the government became repressive, much in the same way that the monarchy had been. Because the theatre was viewed as a tool of political advancement, plays that did not purify public morals or politically align with the central government became censored in some way. Plays were either outright banned, or altered to remove any references to the defunct institutions of the Ancien Régime and to better promote republican morals, as was often the case with familiar classics such as Molière’s Tartuffe. Prior to August 1793, the central government enforced such censorship through repressive means. Because of the Chapelier Law of 1791, passed under the National Assembly, abolishing the censorship of theatre, the government could only ban a particular dramatic performance that could be argued had caused a public disturbance.

This was the case with the play L’Ami des Lois. As the controversial trial of the King was taking place in early 1793, Jean-Louis Laya created the play L’Ami des Lois as an attack on perceived Jacobin extremism of the time and as an expression of his desire for moderation. In the play, Jacobins are depicted as self-interested and calculating villains, while the aristocrats are portrayed as patriotic. Resulting complaints from the public led to the Paris Commune, in part controlled by Jacobins, banning the play for public disturbance. This occurred on January 10, 1793, only eight days after its first production. Playwright Laya protested what he considered an arbitrary censorship to his play. He criticized the new censorship undertaken by the revolutionary French government as more despotic than that of the institutions of the Ancien Régime. Although a supporter of the early stages of the Revolution, Laya’s L’Ami des Lois, and subsequent criticisms of the government, resulted in his official denunciation by Jean-Marie Collot d'Herbois, a member of the Committee of Public Safety. To avoid punishment, Laya went into hiding and did not reappear until after the Reign of Terror had come to an end.

Censorship of the theatre only increased in the following months, paralleling the increasing division amidst the Revolution during the Reign of Terror. On August 2, 1793, the recently formed Committee of Public Safety passed a decree introducing penalties to theatres producing plays contrary to republican ideology by proclaiming that "every theatre in which plays are performed that tend to lower public morale and to revive the shameful superstition of monarchy shall be closed, and the directors arrested and punished in accordance with the full rigor of the law." Furthermore, the following month, the Committee of Public Safety granted the Commune the task of preemptively previewing plays to ensure that they followed republican ideology and did not include any critiques of the current administration. This marked a shift from repressive censorship to that of preventive censorship, carried out in the name of the Republic. Even while undertaking preventive censorship measures, the National Convention continued to promote plays that aligned with its political and moral creed.

The play Guillaume Tell by Antoine-Marin Lemierre, which displayed popular themes of the struggle against tyranny, revolt, sacrifice and liberty, is an example of a play promoted by both the Convention and the Committee of Public Safety. Productions of Guillaume Tell were actually subsidized by the state, as it was one of several plays deemed by the government to best propagate revolutionary ideals. Following the precedent set by the earlier revolutionary governments, even the more conservative government that came to power during the Thermidorian Reaction continued to censor and support plays of its choosing.

== The fourth wall in theatre and politics ==
Paul Friedland suggests that actors in the time of the Ancien Régime were expected to experience the emotions that they were portrayed on-stage. In 1750, however, critics such as Denis Diderot and François Riccoboni argued that the emotions presented on-stage should be illusionary. Friedland argues that by the time of the creation of the National Assembly there was a metaphorical "fourth wall" that divided an awed audience from the actors who created illusions of reality. Friedland interprets this change as resulting from the emergence of revolutionary politics. He calls pre-revolutionary France a "corpus mysticum," or a "mystical body," that was subject only to the will of the monarchy, aristocracy, and clergy. During the Revolution, he continues, power shifted to the parlementaires, who began to operate behind a political "fourth wall", still removed from the actual interests of citizens. Just as audiences in a theatre would suspend their disbelief for the spectacle of the show, so too did citizens begin to have blind faith in the National Assembly's representation of national will.

Friedland uses Marie-Joseph Chénier's play Charles IX, which expresses an anti-monarchical attitude, as an example of the controversy that the "fourth wall" created. When actors refused to participate in the play, the National Assembly and other political organizations intervened, defying the Chapelier law that outlawed government intervention in theatre.

Critics of the theatre argued that the divide between spectators and performers not only reflected, but encouraged the separation between citizens and government. The remodelling of the Théâtre Feydeau in 1789, for example, removed audience boxes on-stage so that the audience was more confined to an area separate from the stage. This change, they argued, signified the lack of transparency of the Ancien Régime. Maximilien Robespierre was an advocate for public vigilante surveillance over the government and so was against this counter-revolutionary form of theatre. Susan Maslan, utilising the theories of Michel Foucault, argues that the shift from the Ancien Régime to the post-revolutionary system signified a "shift from a regime of spectacle to a regime of surveillance."

== Sources ==
- Friedland, Paul. 2002. Political Actors: Representative Bodies and Theatricality in the Age of the French Revolution. New York: Cornell UP.
- Kennedy, Emmet, Marie-Laurence Netter, James P. McGregor, and Mark V.Olsen. 1996. Theatre, Opera, and Audiences in Revolutionary Paris. Connecticut: Greenwood P.
- Maslan, Susan. 2005. Revolutionary Acts: Theatre, Democracy, and the French Revolution. Baltimore: The Johns Hopkins UP.
- McClellan, Michael E. 2004. "The Revolution on Stage: Opera and Politics in France, 1789–1800." National Library of Australia: accessed April 1, 2009.
- Ravel, Jeffrey S. 1999. The Contested Parterre: Public Theatre and French Political Culture, 1680–1791. New York: Cornell UP. ISBN 978-0-8014-8541-1.
- Hemmings, F. W. J. 1994. Theatre and State in France, 1760–1905. Cambridge, England: Cambridge UP.
- Carlson, Marvin. 1966. The Theatre of the French Revolution. Ithaca, N.Y.: Cornell UP.
- Kennedy, Emmet. 1989. A Cultural History of the French Revolution. New Haven: Yale UP.
- Israel, Johnathan. 2014. Revolutionary Ideas: An Intellectual History of the French Revolution from the Rights of Man to Robespierre. Princeton, NJ: The Princeton UP.
- McCready, Susan. 2001. Performing Time in the Revolutionary Theater. Dalhousie French Studies, 55, 26-30.
