= Charles Duveyrier =

French playwright and Saint-Simonianism ideologist

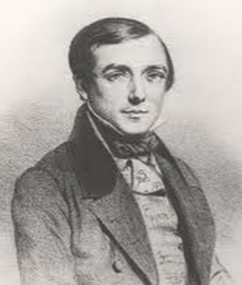
- Charles Duveyrier
- Born: 12 April 1803; Paris
- Died: 10 November 1866 (aged 63); Paris
- Occupations: Playwright, philosopher

Charles Duveyrier (12 April 1803 – 10 November 1866) was a French playwright and Saint-Simonianism ideologist, born on April 12, 1803, in Paris, where he died on November 10, 1866.

== Biography ==
A son of Honoré-Nicolas-Marie Duveyrier and half-brother of the dramatist Anne-Honoré-Joseph Duveyrier known as Mélesville, with whom Charles Duveyrier partnered several times; but he is best known as an adept and propagator of the Saint-Simonian doctrines.

Duveyrier was the father of the Saint-Simonian traveller and geographer Henri Duveyrier.

In addition to the publications of that school of thought, Duveyrier published several texts including l’Avenir et les Bonaparte (1864).

In collaboration with Eugène Scribe, Duveyrier wrote the libretto for I vespri siciliani by Giuseppe Verdi from their work Le duc d'Albe, which was written in 1838 and offered to Halévy and Donizetti before Verdi agreed to set it to music in 1854.

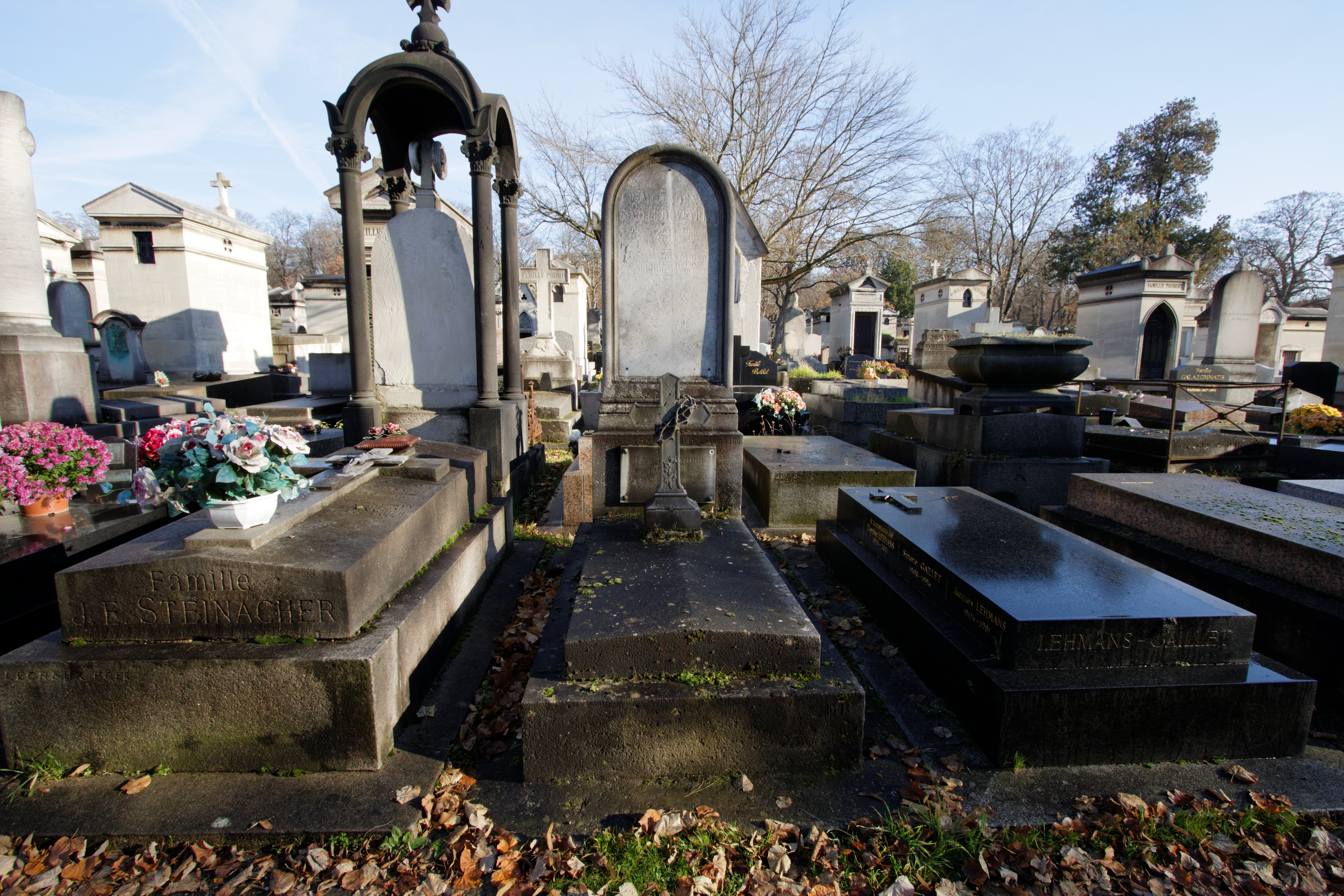
Tombs of Charles and Henri Duveyrier, Père Lachaise Cemetery, division 60

Duveyrier is buried in the Père Lachaise Cemetery (60th division).

== Sources ==
- Gustave Vapereau, Dictionnaire universel des littératures, Paris, Hachette, 1876, p. 687
