= Eugène Nyon =

French vaudevillist and writer (1812–1870)

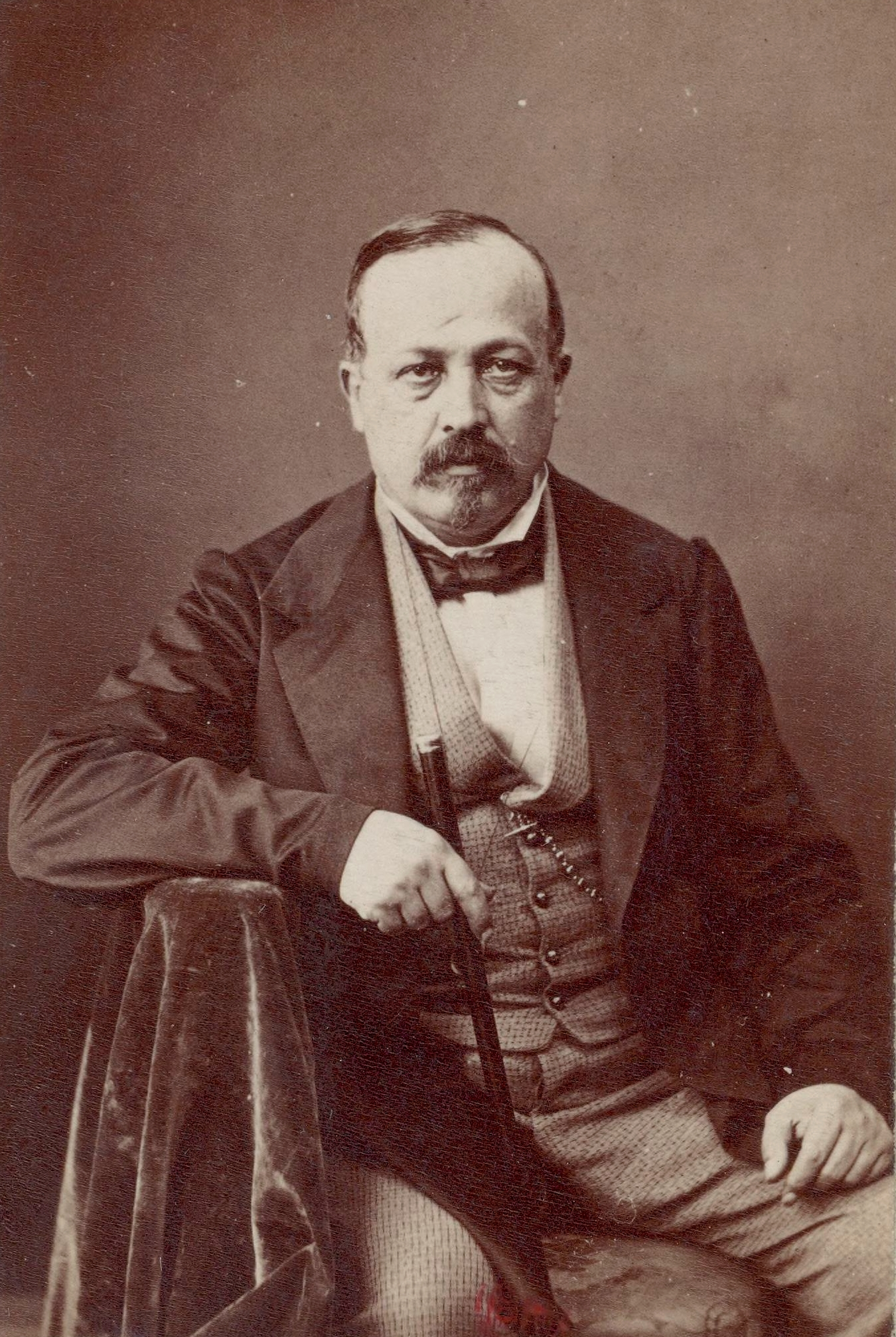
- Born: Charles-Guillaume-Eugène Nyon; 16 March 1812; Savigliano (Piedmont)
- Died: 29 January 1870 (aged 57); 18th arrondissement of Paris
- Occupations: Vaudevillist, novelist
- Years active: 1837 – 1848

Eugène Nyon (16 March 1812 – 29 January 1870) was a French vaudevillist and writer, particularly known for his historical novels and educational stories for young people.

His most famous story is Le Colon de Mettray, set in the Mettray Penal Colony. Eugène Nyon also collaborated with several magazines, including Revue pour tous, under the name Amédée Achard, and the Journal des dames et des modes, which he contributed Parisian chronicles under the name "Countess of Sabran" and of which he was the director for a time. In the theater, his most famous collaborator was Eugène Labiche.

He is buried at Montmartre Cemetery (26th division).

== Works ==
- 1842: Les Pérégrinations, escapades et aventures de Claude La Ramée et de son cousin Labiche, 1842 Texte en ligne
- 1843: Les Dots, nouvelles
- 1844: Les Dévouements
- 1844: Gloire et noblesse
- 1845: Le Colon de Mettray Texte en ligne
- 1845: Les Cieutat, ou le Siège de Villeneuve d'Agen sous Henri III
- 1846: Âme et grandeur
- 1846: Le Français en Écosse, ou le Page de Jacques V, histoire du XVIe
- 1861: Les Nobles Filles
- 1861: Contes et nouvelles. Gloire et noblesse. Les Dots
- 1862: Les Cœurs d'or
- 1863: Grandeur et décadence d'une capote rose
- 1863: La Reine de Jérusalem
- 1863: Les Enfants de Mérovée, récits historiques du Ve au VIIe, Texte en ligne
- 1863: Le Fils du gouverneur, ou le Siège de Villeneuve d'Agen sous Henri III
- 1864: Splendeur et misères d'un dictionnaire grec, souvenirs de pension
- 1864: Moumoute et Carnage
- 1865:Les Aventures de Joachim et de son ami Diego
- 1867: Paul et Jean

Theatre

- Monsieur Jouvenot, ou les Cartes de visite, comédie en vaudevilles in 1 act, Paris, Théâtre de la Gaîté, 31 December 1837
- Le Premier succès de Jean-Baptiste, comédie en vaudevilles in 2 acts, Paris, Théâtre des Délassements-Comiques, 2 November 1841
- Les Noces de Jocrisse, folie-vaudeville in 2 acts, with Édouard Brisebarre, Paris, Théâtre des Folies-Dramatiques, 22 February 1842
- L'Écuyer tranchant, comedy in 1 act, mixed with song, with Édouard Brisebarre, Paris, Théâtre de l'Ambigu-Comique, 22 May 1842
- Les Deux Joseph, comédie en vaudevilles in 1 act, with Charles Potier, Paris, Théâtre des Folies-Dramatiques, 26 May 1842
- Deux paires de bretelles, comédie en vaudevilles in 2 acts, with Édouard Brisebarre, Paris, Théâtre des Folies-Dramatiques, 3 February 1844
- Le Zéro, comedy in 1 act, mixed with song, with Édouard Brisebarre, Paris, Théâtre de l'Ambigu-Comique, 10 March 1844
- La Révolte des Marmouzets, comédie en vaudevilles in 1 act, with Édouard Brisebarre, Paris, Théâtre de l'Ambigu-Comique, 1 July 1845
- Les Murs ont des oreilles, comédie en vaudevilles in 2 acts, mixed with songs, with Auguste Anicet-Bourgeois and Édouard Brisebarre, Paris, Théâtre du Gymnase-Dramatique, 10 September 1845
- L'Enfant de la maison, vaudeville in 1 act, with Eugène Labiche and Charles Varin, Paris, Théâtre du Gymnase, 21 November 1845
- La Modiste au camp, folie-vaudeville in 1 act, with Édouard Brisebarre, Paris, Théâtre des Folies-Dramatiques, 2 April 1846
- La Baronne de Blignac, comédie en vaudevilles in 1 act, with Dumanoir, Paris, Théâtre des Variétés, 6 June 1846
- L'Inventeur de la poudre, comédie en vaudevilles in 1 act, with Eugène Labiche and Auguste Lefranc, Paris, Théâtre du Palais-Royal, 17 June 1846
- Roch et Luc, vaudeville in 1 act, with Édouard Brisebarre, Paris, Théâtre des Variétés, 16 November 1846
- Les Trois paysans, vaudeville in 1 act, with Édouard Brisebarre, Paris, Théâtre des Variétés, 9 May 1847
- Secours contre l'incendie, comedy mixed with distincts, in 1 act, with Auguste Lefranc, Paris, Théâtre du Palais-Royal, 6 July 1847
- La Rose de Provins, vaudeville in 1 act, Paris, Théâtre des Folies-Dramatiques, 12 February 1848
- Un Turc pris dans une porte, scènes de la vie nocturne, with Édouard Brisebarre, Paris, Théâtre des Folies-Dramatiques, 17 February 1849
- Adrienne de Carotteville, ou la Reine de la fantaisie, parody in 1 act of the Juif Errant, with Édouard Brisebarre and Charles Potier, Paris, Théâtre des Délassements-Comiques, 2 July 1849
- Rue de l'Homme-Armé, numéro 8 bis, comédie en vaudevilles in 4 acts, with Eugène Labiche, Paris, Théâtre des Variétés, 24 September 1849
- Les Vignes du Seigneur, vaudeville in 1 act, with Édouard Brisebarre, Paris, Théâtre Montansier, 18 January 1850
- Le Baiser de l'étrier, scènes de la vie de garçon, with Édouard Brisebarre, Paris, Théâtre du Vaudeville, 19 April 1850
- En manches de chemise, vaudeville in 1 act, with Eugène Labiche and Auguste Lefranc, Paris, Théâtre du Palais-Royal, 8 August 1851
- Histoire d'une rose et d'un croque-mort, drama in 5 acts, with Édouard Brisebarre, Paris, Théâtre de l'Ambigu-Comique, 16 August 1851
- Drinn-Drinn, vaudeville in 1 act, with Édouard Brisebarre and Charles Labie, Paris, Théâtre des Variétés, 13 September 1851
- Le Pour et le contre, comedy in 1 act and in prose, with Jean Lafitte, Paris, Théâtre-Français, 22 January 1852
- Le Laquais d'un nègre, comédie en vaudevilles in 4 acts, with Édouard Brisebarre, Théâtre des Folies-Dramatiques, 27 January 1852
- Histoire d'une femme mariée, drama in 3 acts, mixed with songs, with Édouard Brisebarre, Paris, Théâtre de l'Ambigu-Comique, 19 October 1852
- Monsieur le Vicomte, comédie en vaudevilles in 2 acts, with Jules de Prémaray, Paris, Théâtre des Variétés, 10 January 1853
- Monsieur de La Palisse, vaudeville in 1 act, with Pierre Carmouche and Davrecour, Paris, Théâtre des Variétés, 11 May 1854
- Théodore, désespoirs nocturnes d'un célibataire, vaudeville in 1 act, with Édouard Brisebarre, 1854 Text on line
- L'Hiver d'un homme marié, scènes de la vie conjugale, in 1 act, with Édouard Brisebarre, Paris, Théâtre du Vaudeville, 2 June 1855
- Les Gens de théâtre, scènes de la vie dramatique in 5 parts, with Édouard Brisebarre, Paris, Théâtre de l'Odéon, 29 January 1857
- Le Coq de Micylle, comedy in 2 acts, in verses, with Henry Trianon, Paris, Théâtre-Français, 7 May 1868.
