= Épicure (opera) =

Méhul in 1799 – portrait by Antoine Gros

Épicure (Epicurus) is an opera in three acts with music by the composers Étienne Méhul and Luigi Cherubini. The libretto is by Charles-Albert Demoustier. It was first performed at the Opéra-Comique, Paris on 14 March 1800. It was a complete failure, enjoying only three performances. For the third and final performance on 20 March the opera was reduced from three acts to two. Cherubini wrote the overture, the first act and half of the third; Méhul the second act and the rest of the third.

== Roles ==
Role	Voice type	Premiere Cast
Épicure (Epicurus)		
Aspasie		
Narcisse (Narcissus)		
Ruston		
Démocrite (Democritus)		
Héraclite (Heraclitus)		
La Sagesse (Wisdom)		

== Synopsis ==
Epicurus is loved by his pupil Aspasia but he believes she feels no more than friendship for him. Four suitors compete for Aspasia's hand in marriage: Narcissus, the Sybarite; Ruston, the Stoic; Heraclitus ("the weeping philosopher"); and Democritus ("the laughing philosopher"). When Aspasia receives them coldly they suspect Epicurus is the cause and they denounce him to the Areopagus. Epicurus is taken to prison where his philosophy helps him to survive and he converts his warder. He falls asleep and has a vision of Wisdom descending from heaven. The next day, Epicurus is led before the Areopagus, where he is accused of seducing young people and preaching corruption. Epicurus proves his philosophy is based on moral principles. Aspasia comes to his aid and exposes the criminal motives behind the denunciation. Epicurus is found not guilty and pardons his accusers.

== Sources ==
- Arthur Pougin Méhul: sa vie, son génie, son caractère (Fischbacher, 1889)
- General introduction to Méhul's operas in the introduction to the edition of Stratonice by M. Elizabeth C. Bartlet (Pendragon Press, 1997)
- Leorigildo Salerno, "Les mésaventures de L'amour fugitif: Genèse de Anacréon de Luigi Cherubini (1803)" in Schweizer Jahrbuch für Musikwissenschaft 2008/2009 (Peter Lang, 2009)
