= Le crescendo =

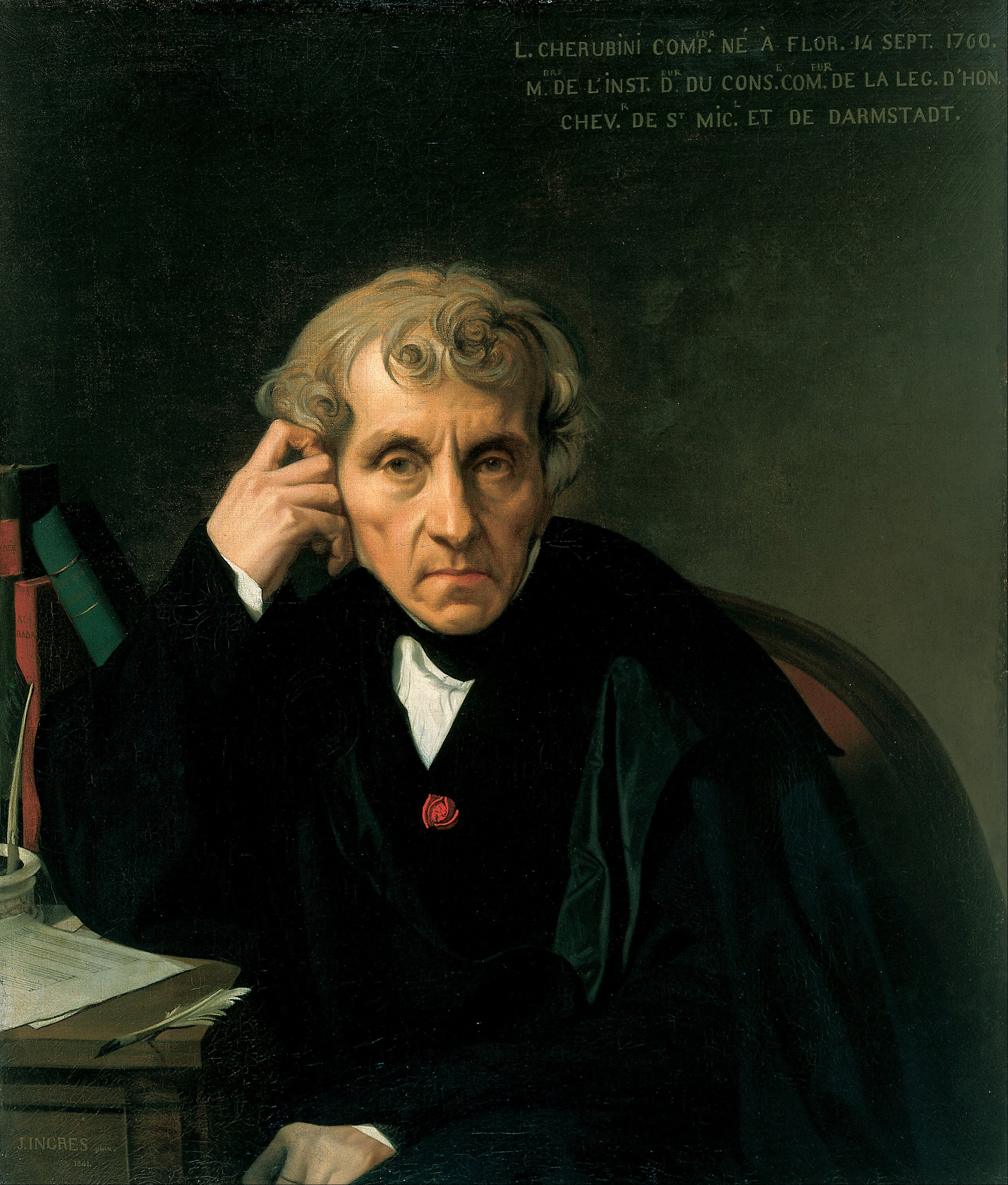
Luigi Cherubini

Le crescendo (The Crescendo) is a comic opera (opéra-buffon imité de l'italien) in one act by Luigi Cherubini with a libretto by Charles Augustin [de Bassompierre] Sewrin. The libretto is based on the opera buffa L'Angiolina ovvero Il matrimonio per sussurro with music by Antonio Salieri (Vienna, 1800) and by Valentino Fioravanti (Lisbon, 1803).

== Performance history ==
It was first performed by the Opéra-Comique at the Salle Feydeau in Paris on 1 September 1810 with a further nine performances. The opera was revived at the Salle Favart on 4 June 1960 by the Piccolo Teatro Musicale with the Virtuosi di Roma in an adaptation by Giulio Confolinieri, staged by Corrado Pavolini with sets and costumes by Franco Laurenti.

== Roles ==
Roles, voice types, premiere cast
Cast	Voice type	Premiere cast, 1 September 1810
Sophie	soprano	Belmont
Alphonse	tenor	Paul
Captain Bloum	baritone	Jean-Pierre Solié
Philippe	baritone	Martin
Major Frankenstein	bass	Chénard

== Synopsis ==
Major Frankenstein wishes to marry Sophie, the niece of his neighbour, Captain Bloum, but Bloum's nephew Alphonse is also in love with the girl. Major Frankenstein cannot stand noise and he is so horrified at the sound of the ball to celebrate the wedding that he cannot go ahead with the ceremony and persuades his nephew to marry her instead. Sophie, who has in fact planned this all along, gladly accepts her new bridegroom.

== Scores ==
The full score of the overture was published (Bibliothèque nationale de France, shelf mark L. 2400), and there is an autograph manuscript of the piano-vocal score (Berlin State Library, Cherubini archive no. 151). The libretto was also printed (Bibliothèque-Musée de l'Opéra, Paris, Liv. 19 oc 132, 1810 edition).
