= Charles-Albert Demoustier =

French writer (1760–1801)

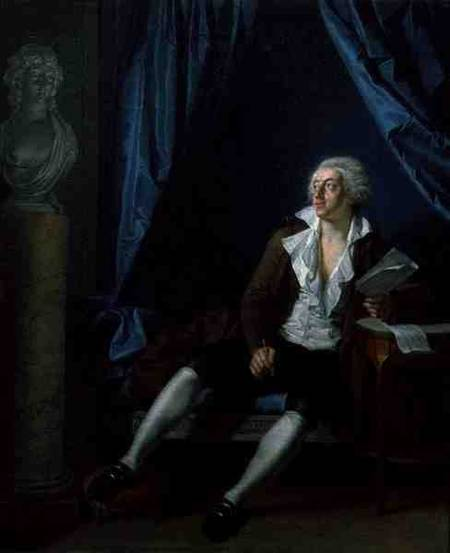
Charles-Albert Demoustier

Charles-Albert Demoustier (13 March 1760 – 2 March 1801) was a French writer. He falsely claimed to be a descendant of La Fontaine by his mother and Racine by his father.

Demoustier was born in Villers-Cotterêts. He worked as a lawyer, but later decided to become a writer. In 1786, he published the first part of Lettres à Emilie sur la mythologie. The sixth part was published in 1798. These works, alternating prose and madrigal-like verses, were very successful.

Demoustier tried to edit Lettres à Emilie sur la mythologie, but the bookseller who owned the copyrights refused to let him do so, perhaps because he had a stock of earlier copies he wanted to get rid of first. Demoustier was unable to wait, as he died a painful, premature death, in Paris, soon after.

He also wrote comedies, among them:

- Conciliateur ou l'Homme aimable, in 5 acts and in verse, 1791
- Le divorce, in 2 acts and in verse
- Femmes, in 3 acts and in verse
- Alceste ou le misanthrope corrigé, in 3 acts and in verse

Demoustier also wrote librettos to some operas (e.g. Épicure, 1800), a Cours de morale, Opuscules and short Poèmes, 1804.

Four of his poems were set to music by Maurice Jaubert.
