= Ali Baba (Cherubini) =

1833 opera by Luigi Cherubini

- Opera by Luigi Cherubini
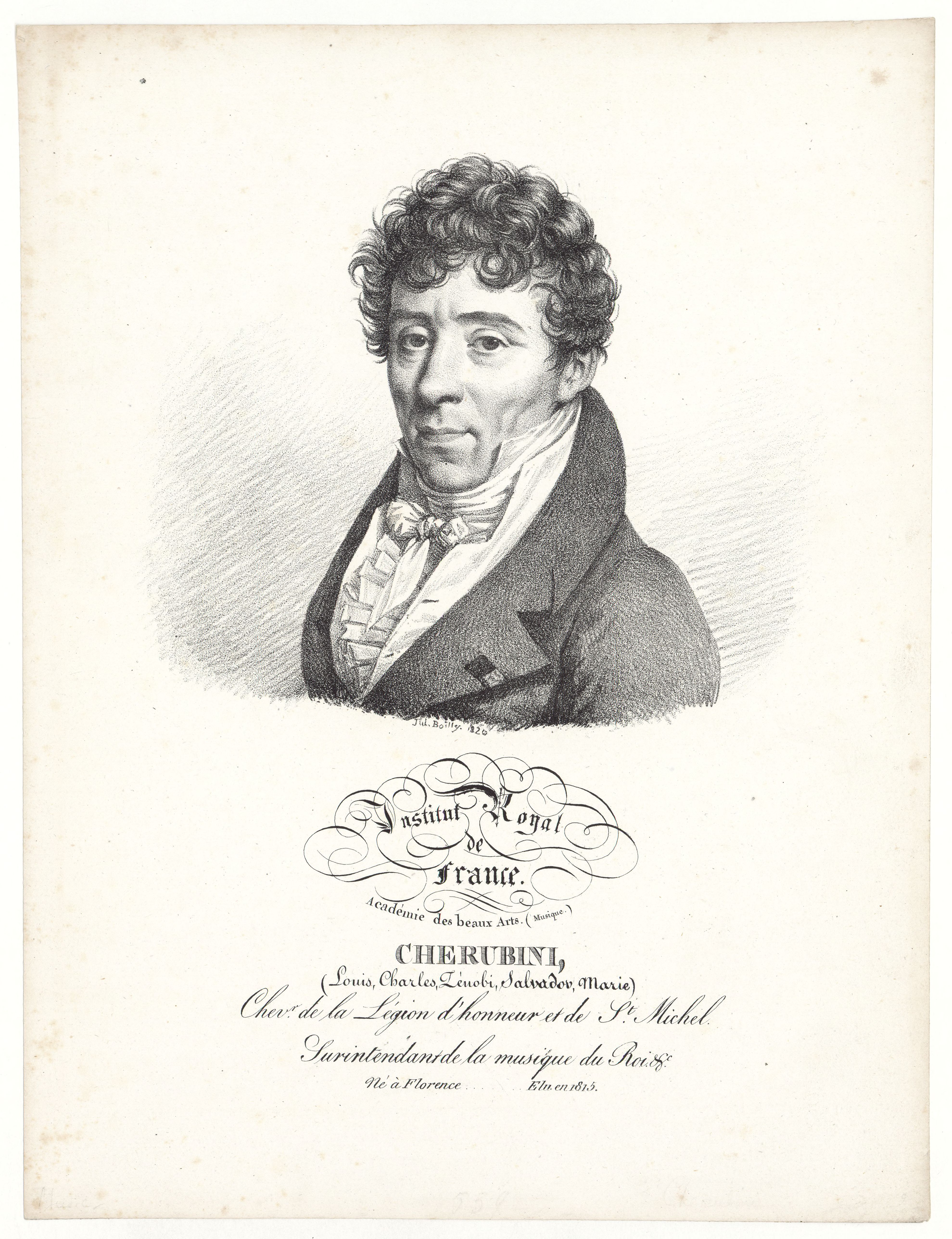
- Luigi Cherubini in 1820
- Librettist: Eugène Scribe; Mélesville
- Language: French
- Based on: Ali Baba and the Forty Thieves
- Premiere: 22 July 1833; Salle Le Peletier, Paris

Ali Baba, ou Les quarante voleurs is a tragédie lyrique in four acts plus a prologue, with libretto by Eugène Scribe and Mélesville and music by Luigi Cherubini. The story is based on the tale Ali Baba and the Forty Thieves (One Thousand and One Nights). It was premiered by the Paris Opera in the Salle Le Peletier on 22 July 1833. It was Cherubini's last opera, though he lived for nearly a decade longer. It is also his longest opera, lasting for about three and a half hours at the premiere.

Some of the music was adapted and rewritten from his Koukourgi (written in 1793, but unproduced; first performed in 2010).

== Performance history ==
The opera premiered in Paris on 22 July 1833 and achieved 10 performances by the end of that year, but was dropped from the repertory after the 11th performance on 24 February 1834, and was never played again. Hector Berlioz called it "one of the feeblest things Cherubini ever wrote". Felix Mendelssohn discussed the opera in his letter of 25 December 1834 to Ignaz Moscheles, stating that Cherubini was craven to serve the new style en vogue in Paris at that time.

It was resurrected by La Scala in 1963, but again faced negative reviews. A live recording was made and was subsequently issued.

The overture has found a place in the concert repertoire for symphony orchestras.

== Roles ==
Roles, voice types, premiere cast
Role	Voice type	Premiere cast, 22 July 1833	La Scala revival (1963) Conductor: Nino Sanzogno
Ali Baba	baritone	Nicolas Levasseur	Wladimiro Ganzarolli
Delia	soprano	Laure Cinti-Damoreau	Teresa Stich-Randall
Morgiane	soprano	Cornélie Falcon	Orianna Santunione
Nadir	tenor	Adolphe Nourrit	Alfredo Kraus
Aboul-Hassan	baritone	Alexandre-Aimé Prévost	Paolo Montarsolo
Calaf	tenor	Jean-Étienne-Auguste Massol	Piero de Palma
Ours-Kan	bass	Henri-Bernard Dabadie	Lorenzo Testi
Thamar	bass	Nicolas-Prosper Dérivis	Agostino Ferrin
Phaor	tenor		Virgilio Carbonari

== Synopsis ==
Nadir is in love with Delia, the daughter of wealthy merchant Ali Baba, but desperate to marry her because he is poor. Ali Baba has promised Delia to the head collector Aboul-Hassan. However, Nadir found a treasure hidden in a cave by a gang of robbers and asks for Delia's hand. Ali Baba wants to know the secret of Nadir's wealth and is led to the cave, where it remains trapped and is captured by the thieves. While the robbers have taken possession of a load of bales of coffee Ali Baba was smuggling, Aboul-Hassan, furious at the thought of not being able to have Delia, kidnapped her. The robbers then ask a ransom to release Ali Baba and try to storm the house of the merchant hiding in bales of coffee. The situation seems to change for the worse for Nadir and his men, but Aboul-Hassan and his soldiers come and order that the bales be burned and the leaders of the gang arrested.

== Releases ==
- 1963: Wladimiro Ganzarolli (Alì Babà), Teresa Stich-Randall (Delia), Orianna Santunione (Morgiane), Alfredo Kraus (Nadir), Paolo Montarsolo (Aboul-Hassan), Piero de Palma (Calaf), Lorenzo Testi (Ours-Kan), Agostino Ferrin (Thamar), Virgilio Carbonari (Phaor). Conductor: Nino Sanzogno. Orchestra and chorus of La Scala – live recording – LP: E. J. Smith The Golden Age of Opera EJS 393; Mauro R. Fuguette MRF C 05; Melodram MEL 170. CD: Nuova Era 2361/2
