= Jean-Louis Laya =

French playwright (1761–1833)

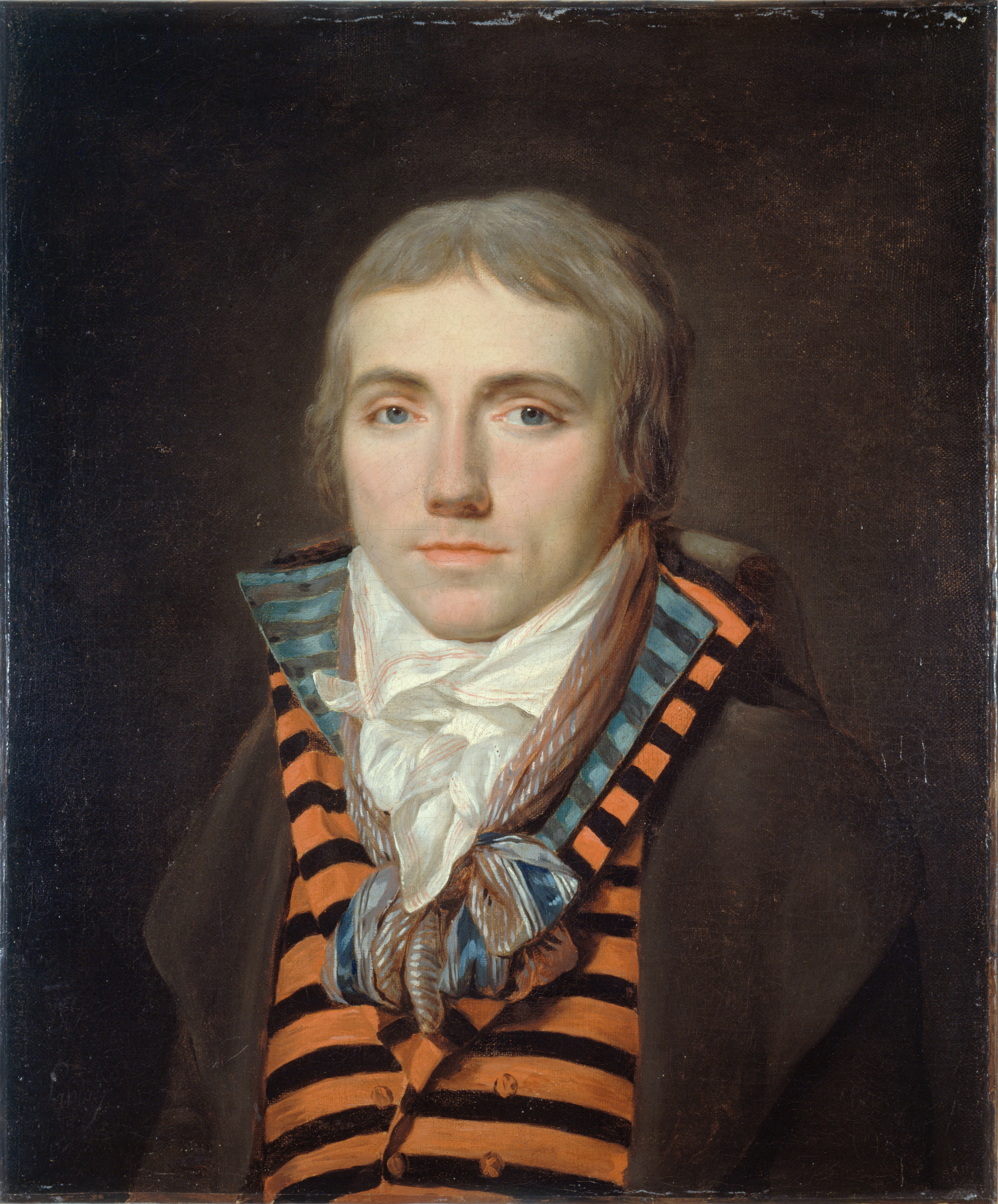
Portrait by Louis Landry, c. 1795

Jean-Louis Laya (4 December 1761, Paris – 25 August 1833, Meudon) was a French playwright. He wrote his first comedy in collaboration with Gabriel-Marie Legouvé in 1785. The piece, however, though accepted by the Comédie française, was never staged. In 1789 he produced a plea for religious toleration in the form of a five-act tragedy in verse, Jean Calas. In his next work, the injustice of the disgrace cast on a family by the crime of one of its members formed the theme of Les Dangers de l'opinion (1790).

Laya is best remembered for L'Ami des lois (1793). This energetic protest against mob rule, with its thinly veiled characterizations of Maximilien Robespierre as Nomophage (law-eater) and of Jean-Paul Marat as Duricrâne (hard head), was quite bold, given that the play opened at the Théâtre Français (temporarily Théâtre de la Nation) only nineteen days before the execution of Louis XVI.

Ten days after its first production the piece was prohibited by the Commune, but the public demanded its performance; the mayor of Paris was compelled to appeal to the National Convention, and the piece was played while some 30,000 Parisians guarded the hall. Laya went into hiding, and several persons convicted of having a copy of the play in their possession were guillotined.

At the end of the Terror, Laya returned to Paris. In 1813 he replaced Delille in the Paris chair of literary history and French poetry; he was admitted to the Académie française in 1817. In 1797, Laya produced Les Deux Stuarts, and in 1799, Falkland, the title-role of which provided Talma with one of his finest opportunities. Laya's works, which were published in a collected edition in 1836-1837, receive interest primarily due to the circumstances in which they were written and staged. His son, Léon, was also a playwright.

== Works ==
=== Theatre ===
- 1790: Les Dangers de l'opinion, drama in 5 acts, in verse, Théâtre de la Nation, 19 January
- 1790: Jean Calas, tragedy in 5 acts and in verse, Paris, Théâtre de la Nation, 18 December
- 1793: L'Ami des lois, comedy in 5 acts in verse, Paris, Théâtre de la Nation, 2 January.read online on Gallica
- 1798: Falkland, ou La conscience, drama in five acts in prose, Paris, Théâtre-Français, 25 May
- 1799: Une Journée du jeune Néron, comedy burlesque in 2 acts and in verse, Paris, Théâtre de l'Odéon, 15 February

=== Trivia ===
- 1789: Voltaire aux Français, sur leur constitution (1789)
- 1789: La Régénération des comédiens en France, ou leurs droits à l'état civil (1789)
- 1793: Almanach sur l'état des comédiens en France, ou leurs droits défendus comme citoyens, par l'auteur de « L'Ami des lois »
- 1836: Œuvres complètes. Études sur l'histoire littéraire de l'antiquité grecque et latine, et sur les premiers siècles de la littérature française
