= Mélesville fils =

French playwright

Honoré-Marie-Joseph Duveyrier called Mélesville fils (1820, Paris – 6 February 1904, Cannes) was a 19th-century French playwright. Anne-Honoré-Joseph Duveyrier, called Mélesville, (1787–1865) was his father.

- 1855 : Les Deux Gilles, opérette bouffe, Théâtre des Folies-Nouvelles
