= Henri Duveyrier =

French explorer and geographer

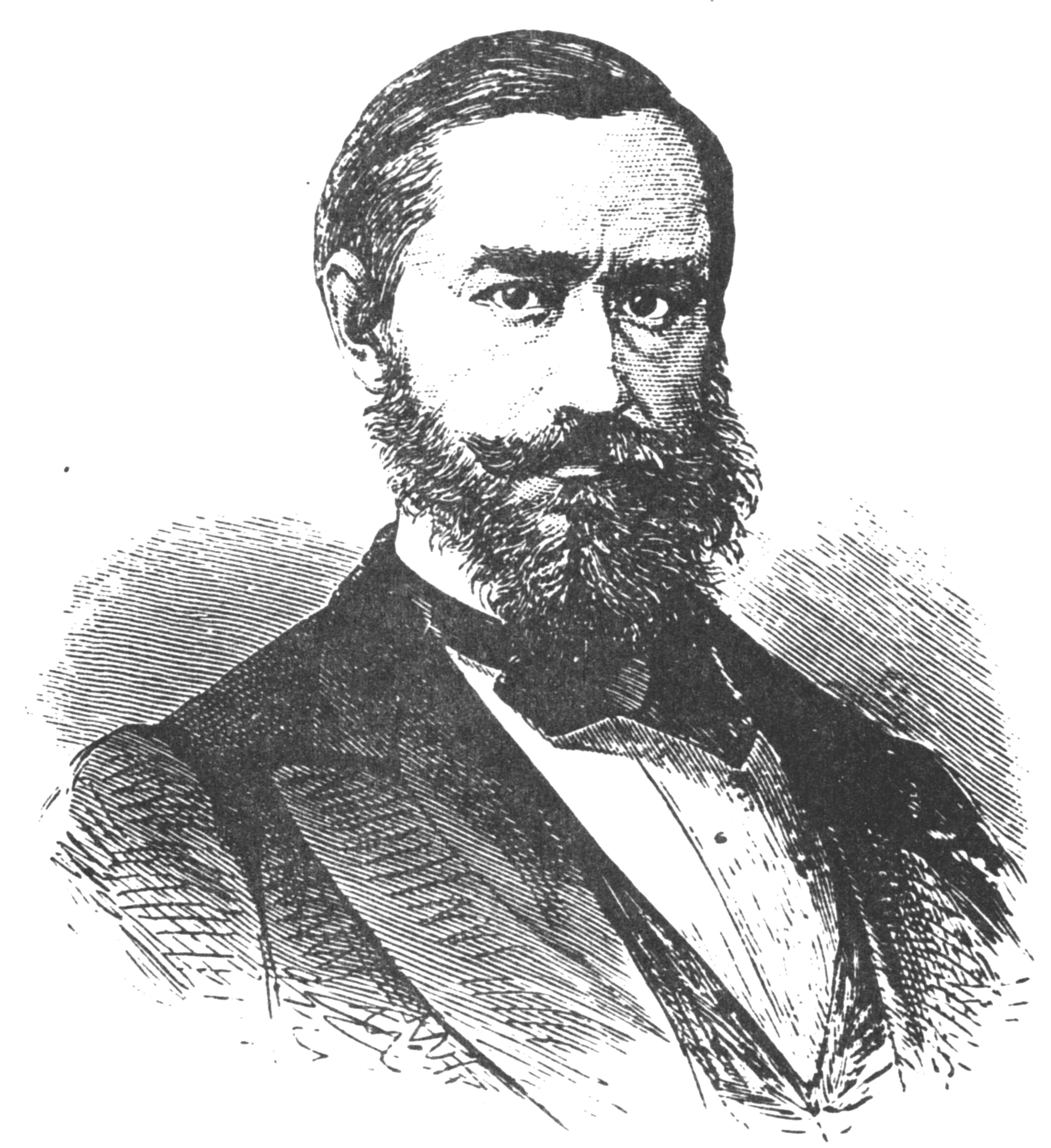
- Born: 28 February 1840; Paris, France
- Died: 25 April 1892 (aged 52); Sèvres, France
- Occupations: Explorer and geographer

Henri Duveyrier (28 February 1840 – 25 April 1892) was a French explorer and geographer, known for his exploration of the Sahara. Duveyrier was a son of the French playwright Charles Duveyrier, while his mother was English. During his late teens in 1857, he decided to take a five-week trip from Kandouri to Laghouat and back. He took an interest in the Tuaregs which he met in this trip, and later presented an account of Tuareg customs to the Berlin Oriental Society. In December 1861, he returned from a failed expedition to Tuat while being delirious with fever. In 1864, he published a memoir about the exploration of Sahara with an emphasis on the Tuaregs.

Following his experiences as a prisoner of war in the Franco-Prussian War, Duveyrier resumed his journeys in the Sahara. He covered regions immediately south of the Atlas Mountains, from the eastern confines of Morocco to Tunisia. He published further books on these areas. Duveyrier was later blamed for the failure of the Flatters Expedition, and for giving false hope to those wishing to transform the Tuaregs into linemen for camel railway crossings. Following the premature death of his fiancée, Duveyrier committed suicide in 1892.

== Life ==
Duveyrier was born in Paris, the eldest child of Charles Duveyrier (1803–1866), a well-known dramatist, and his English wife Ellen Claire née Denie. Charles Duveyrier was a follower of the utopian philosophical movement started by Henri de Saint-Simon. In 1857 and 1858, Duveyrier spent some months in London, where he met Heinrich Barth, then preparing an account of his travels in the western Sudan.

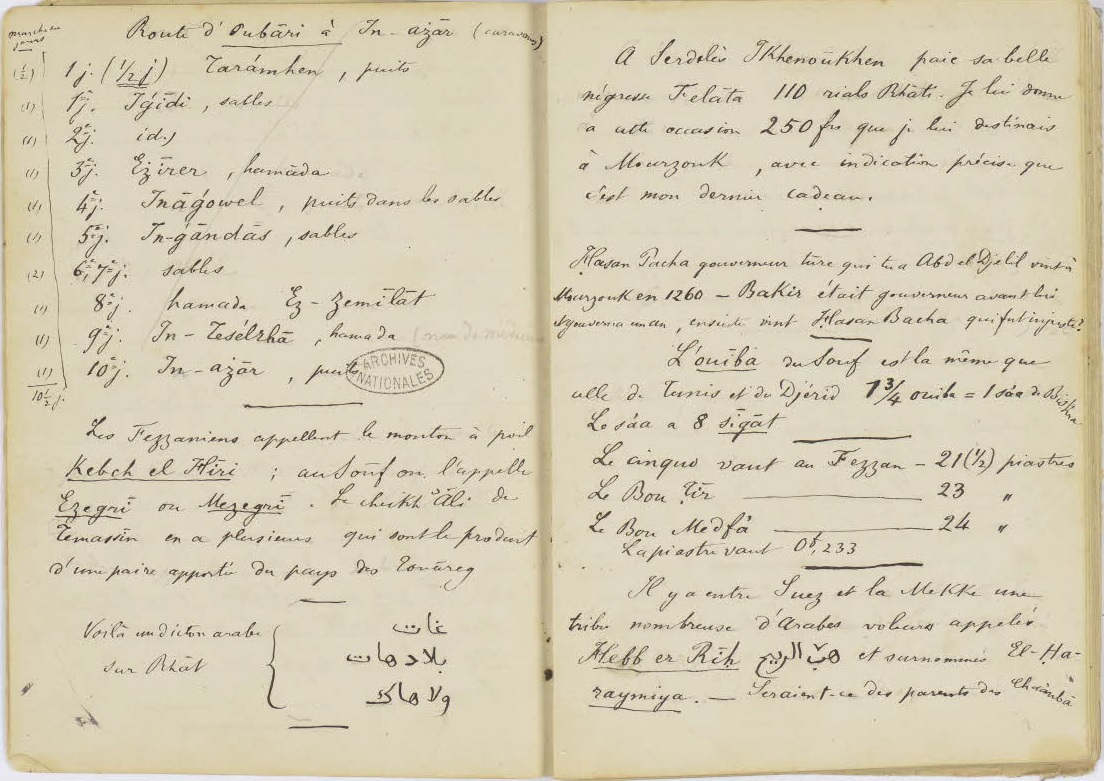
Exploration book of Henri Duveyrier, 6–28 August 1859, Archives nationales.

Duveyrier was Auguste Warnier's guest in 1857 at his home in Kandouri, a suburb of Algiers, where he met Oscar MacCarthy. On 8 March 1857 Duveyrier and MacCarthy left on a five-week trip to Laghouat and back. Duveyrier was fascinated by the Tuaregs he met on this trip and the next year gave an account of Tuareg customs to the Berlin Oriental Society. Later Duveyrier made an unsuccessful attempt to reach Tuat, which was stopped by the Tuaregs at El Goléa. Duveyrier left in May 1859 and after an exhausting journey returned to Warnier's house on 5 December 1861, emaciated and delirious with fever. In 1864, two years after returning to France, he published Exploration du Sahara: les Touareg du nord (Exploration of the Sahara: Tuaregs of the North), for which he received the gold medal of the Paris Geographical Society.

In the Franco-Prussian War of 1870 he was taken prisoner by the Germans. After his release he made several further journeys in the Sahara, adding considerably to the knowledge of the regions immediately south of the Atlas Mountains, from the eastern confines of Morocco to Tunisia. He also examined the Algerian and Tunisian chotts and explored the interior of western Tripoli. Duveyrier devoted special attention to the customs and speech of the Tuareg people, with whom he lived for months at a time, and to the organization of the Senussi.

In 1881 he published La Tunisie, and in 1884 La confrérie musulmane de Sîdî Mohammed ben Alî-Senoûsi et son domaine géographique en l'année 1300 de l'Hégire.

Duveyrier was adversely affected by the tragedy that befell the Flatters Expedition of 1880–81 which put an end to the proposed Trans Sahara railway and military expansion in the region. Those who had dreamed of transforming the Tuareg into linemen for camel railway crossings blamed Duveyrier for their disappointment. Duveyrier's errored in having described the Tuareg as veiled, turbaned medieval paladins as well as insistence on a smaller less defendable convoy; but the explorer was already shaken by the premature death of his fiancée, and embittered by the controversy, he committed suicide in 1892.

== Works ==
- Duveyrier, Henri (1864). Exploration du Sahara: Les Touareg du nord (in French). Paris: Challamel aîné. Gutenberg
- Duveyrier, Henri (1881). La Tunisie (in French). Paris: Hachette.
- Duveyrier, Henri (1884). La confrérie musulmane de Sîdî Mohammed ben Alî-Senoûsi et son domaine géographique en l'année 1300 de l'Hégire (in French). Paris: Société de géographie.
- Duveyrier, Henri (1900). Journal d'un voyage dans la province d'Alger, février, mars, avril 1857 (in French). Paris: Challamel.
- Duveyrier, Henri (1905). Sahara algérien et tunisien: Journal de route de Henri Duveyrier (in French). Paris: Challamel. Gutenberg

== Sources ==
- Heffernan, Michael (November 1989). "The Limits of Utopia: Henri Duveyrier and the Exploration of the Sahara in the Nineteenth Century". The Geographical Journal. 155 (3): 342–352. doi:10.2307/635209. JSTOR 635209.
- Novaresio, Paolo (2003). Sahara. Thunder Bay Press. pp. 44–45. ISBN 1-59223-038-5.
- Valette, Jacques (Fall–Winter 1980). "Pénétration française au Sahara et exploration : le cas de Paul Soleillet". Revue française d'histoire d'outre-mer (in French). 67 (248–249): 253–267. doi:10.3406/outre.1980.2261.
