= Louis Amédée Achard =

French novelist (1814–1875)

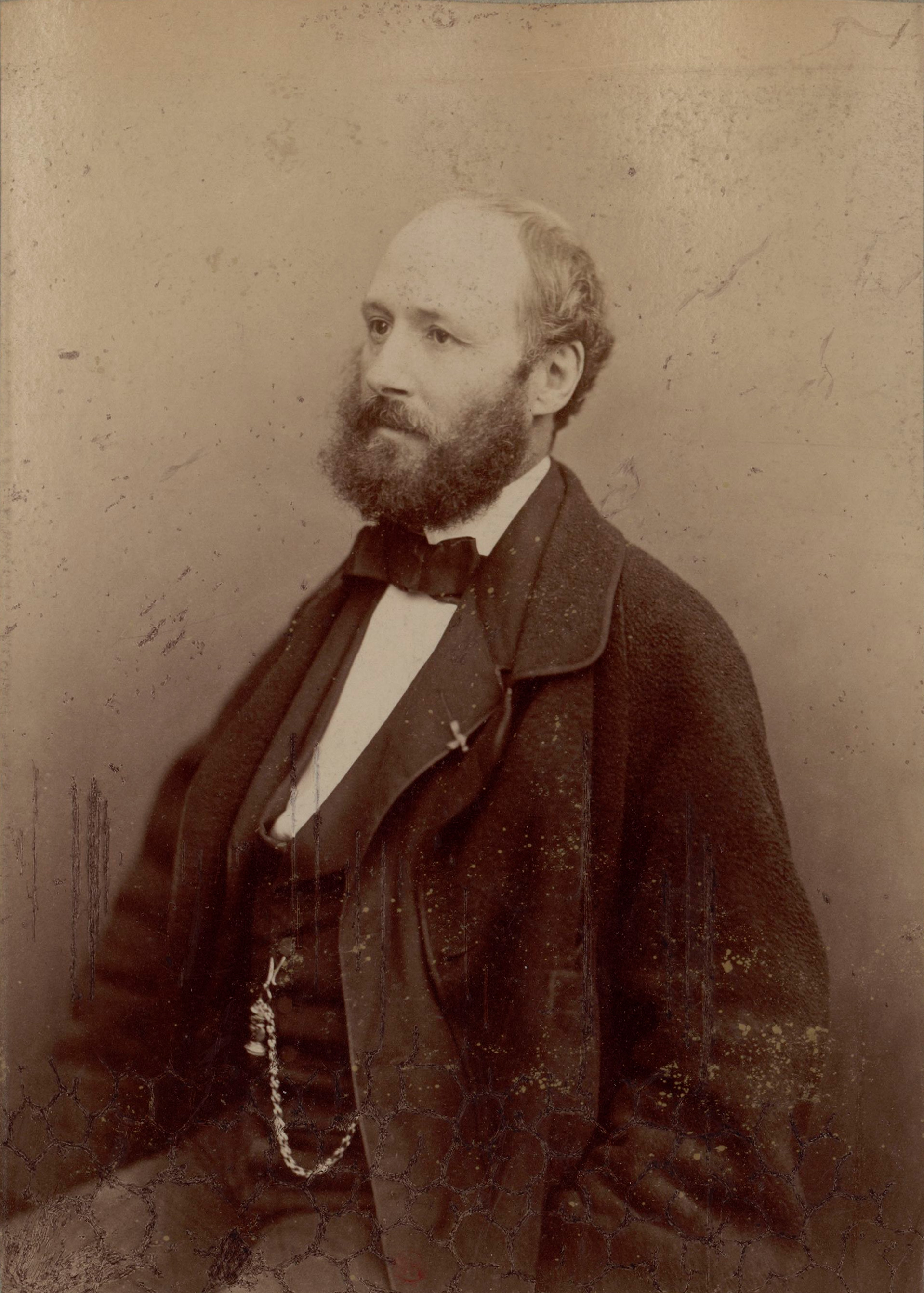
Achard by Nadar.

Louis Amédée Eugène Achard (19 April 1814 – 25 March 1875) was a prolific French novelist.

Achard was born in Marseille. After a short stay near Algiers, where he supervised a farm, he went to Toulouse, and then Marseille, where he became a journalist and wrote for the Sémaphore. He moved to Paris, where he wrote for the Vert-Vert, the Entracte, the Charivari, and the Époque. Achard wrote extensively for the Époque, even writing for his colleagues when they lacked inspiration. He then collaborated in the satirical journal Le Pamphlet, and was gravely wounded in a duel with a man named Fiorentino, whom he had defamed. While still convalescent, he left for Italy with the French Army to cover the war for the Journal des Débats.

Achard was a prolific writer. In addition to his journalism, he wrote about thirty plays and about forty books. He is known today primarily for his cloak and dagger novels. Some incorrectly claim that he was the originator of the term (Ponson du Terrail used the term a little before him), but he did write a novel called la Cape et l'Épée (The Cloak and Dagger) in 1875. Achard also wrote many books on manners. He died, aged 60, in Paris.

== Works ==
- Belle-Rose (1847)
- Les Petits-fils de Lovelace (1854)
- La Robe de Nessus (1855)
- Maurice de Treuil (1857)
- Le Clos Pommier (1858)
- La Sabotière (1859)
- Les Misères d'un millionnaire (1861)
- Histoire d'un homme (1863)
- Les Coups d'épée de M. de La Guerche (1863) Republished by Phébus in 1991
- Mme de Sarens (1865)
- La Chasse à l'idéal (1867)
- Marcelle (1868)
- Envers et contre tous (1874) (sequel to Les Coups d'épées de M. de La Guerche) Republished by Phébus in 1991
- La Cape et l'Épée (1875)
- Toison d'or (1875) (sequel to La Cape et l'Épée)

== Bibliography ==
- "Amédée Achard" (in French). La Bibliothèque électronique du Québec. Archived from the original on 2007-04-11.
- "Amédée Achard" (in French). In Libro Veritas. Archived from the original on 2007-09-26.
