= Honoré-Nicolas-Marie Duveyrier =

French lawyer, politician, playwright (1753–1839)

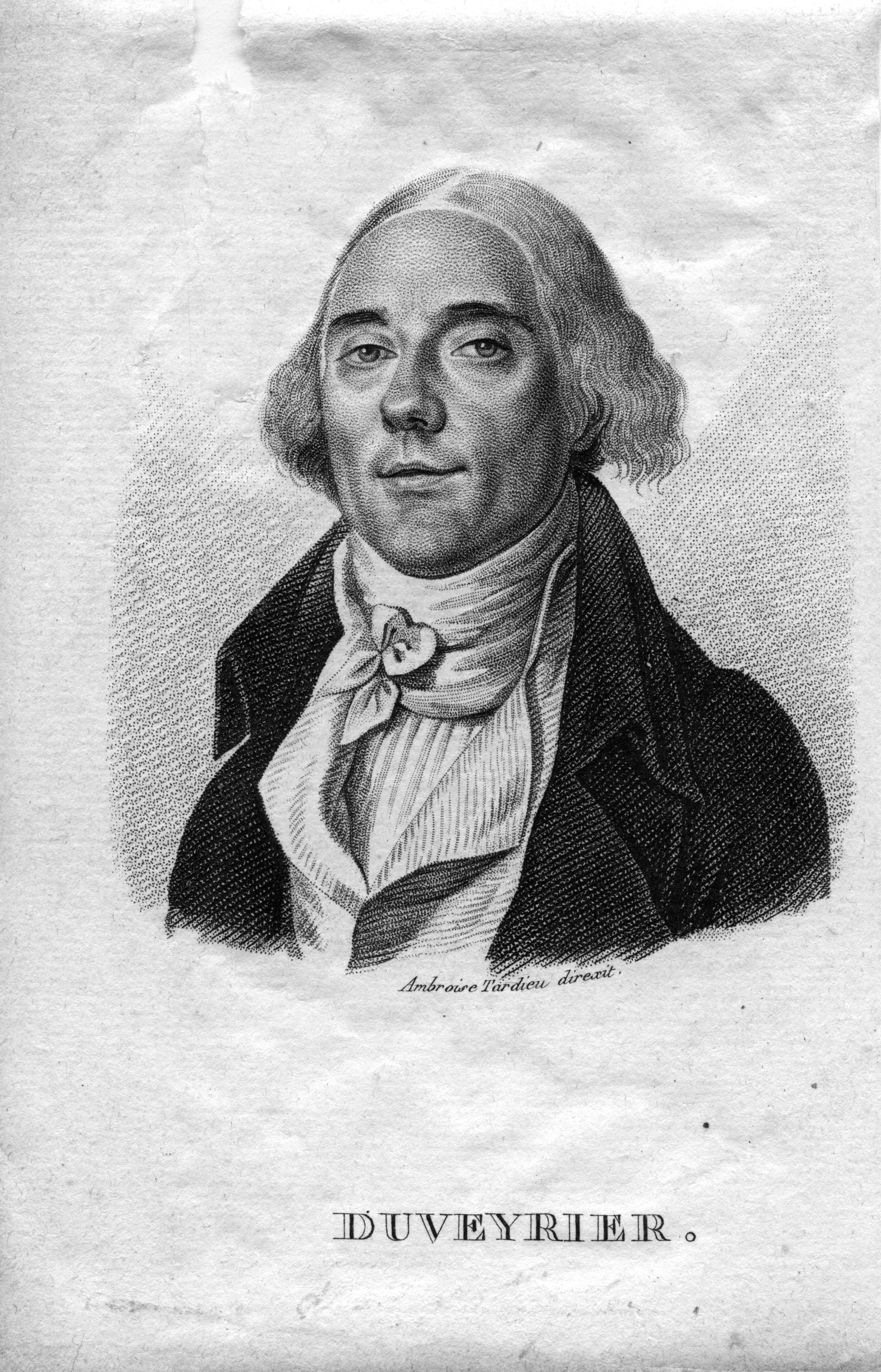
- Born: 6 December 1753; Pignans, France
- Died: 25 May 1839 (aged 85); Maffliers, France
- Occupations: Playwright; Lawyer; Politician
- Spouses: Adélaïde-Marie-Anne Lespardat; Philippine-Marguerite Servins

Honoré-Nicolas-Marie Duveyrier (6 December 1753 – 25 May 1839) was an 18th–19th-century French lawyer, politician and playwright.

== Biography ==
The second son of Noble-Gaspard Duveyrier and Marie-Madeleine de Nivelet, Honoré Duveyrier received a military education in Perpignan before devoting himself to law in Paris. Once he became a successful lawyer, he was received in 1779 in Parlement

He first married Adélaïde-Marie-Anne Lespardat with whom he had two children: Anne-Honoré-Joseph Duveyrier, called Mélesville, and Charles Duveyrier. En deuxièmes noces, he married Philippine-Marguerite Servins, with no offspring.

Three days before his flight to Varennes, Louis XVI sent him in a mission to the Prince of Condé, but he was taken prisoner by the Austrians. Upon his return, he was one of five commissioners delegated August 11, 1792 by the section des Piques to the General Council of the Paris Commune. He was imprisoned at the instigation of Robespierre. After his release, he was employed abroad as Commissioner for supplying the French armies. In 1796, he resumed his practice in Paris, before becoming Deputy Head of Finance in Rome, where he acquired a large fortune. He then became President of the Court of Appeal of Montpellier.

Around 1808, he was president of the Montpellier Court of Appeal and became Baron of the Empire in 1810.

Died in 1839, he is buried at Père Lachaise Cemetery (35th division).

== Works ==
- La Cour plénière : héroï-tragi-comédie in three acts and in prose performed 14 July 1788 by a company of amateurs in a castle in the surroundings of Versailles by abbé de Vermond, lecteur de la reine, authors Honoré Duveyrier and Antoine Joseph Gorsas, publisher Liberté, 1788, 104 pages
- Le Lever de Bâville: drame héroïque in 3 acts, pour servir de suite à "La cour plénière", authors Jean-George Le Franc de Pompignan, Honoré-Marie-Nicolas Duveyrier and Antoine-Joseph Gorsas, publisher Barbarini, 1788.
- Histoire des premiers électeurs de Paris en 1789, extraite de leur procès-verbal by [Honoré] Duveyrier… précédée d'une introduction et d'un essai sur le corps électoral… by Charles Duveyrier, Paris, Brussels, 1828, 456 p. (Google Books)

== Sources ==
- Alphonse Rabbe, Claude Augustin Vieilh de Boisjoslin et Charles Claude Binet de Sainte-Preuve, Biographie universelle et portative des contemporains; ou, Dictionnaire historique des hommes vivants et des hommes morts depuis 1788 jusqu'à nos jours: qui se sont fait remarquer par leurs écrits, leurs actions, leurs talents, leurs vertus ou leurs crimes, Volume 4, 1836, (p. 1557–1558).
- George Ripley & Charles A. Dana, The American Cyclopaedia Duveyrier. I. Honore Nicolas Marie
- Paul Bauer, Deux siècles d'histoire au Père-Lachaise, Versailles, Mémoire & Documents, 2006, 867 p. (ISBN 291461148X)
