= Luigi Cherubini =

Italian composer (1760–1842)

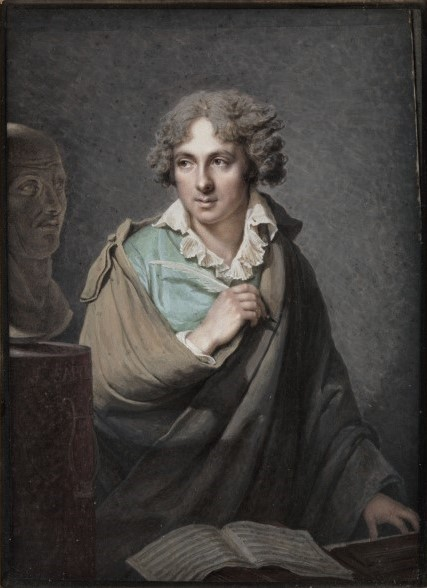
- Portrait of Cherubini with a bust of his mentor Giuseppe Sarti (1792)
- Born: Maria Luigi Carlo Zenobio Salvatore Cherubini; 8 September 1760; Florence, Grand Duchy of Tuscany
- Died: 15 March 1842 (aged 81); Paris, France
- Era: Classical, Romantic

Maria Luigi Carlo Zenobio Salvatore Cherubini (/ˌkɛrʊˈbiːni/ KERR-uu-BEE-nee; Italian: [luˈiːdʒi keruˈbiːni]; 8 or 14 September 1760 – 15 March 1842) was an Italian Classical and Romantic composer. His most significant compositions are operas and sacred music. Beethoven regarded Cherubini as the greatest living composer of his era. Cherubini's operas were heavily praised and interpreted by Rossini.

== Early years ==
He was born Maria Luigi Carlo Zenobio Salvatore Cherubini in Florence in 1760. There is uncertainty about his date of birth. Although 14 September is sometimes stated, evidence from baptismal records and Cherubini himself suggests 8 September is correct. Perhaps the strongest evidence is his first name, Maria, which is traditional for a child born on 8 September, the feast-day of the Nativity of the Virgin. His instruction in music began at the age of six with his father, Bartolomeo, maestro al cembalo ("master of the harpsichord", in other words, ensemble leader from the harpsichord). Considered a child prodigy, Cherubini studied counterpoint and dramatic style at an early age. By the time he was thirteen, he had composed several religious works.

== Adulthood and first operas ==
In 1780, he was awarded a scholarship by the Grand Duke of Tuscany to study music in Bologna and Milan. Cherubini's early opere serie used libretti by Apostolo Zeno, Metastasio (Pietro Trapassi), and others that adhered closely to standard dramatic conventions. His music was strongly influenced by Niccolò Jommelli, Tommaso Traetta, and Antonio Sacchini, who were the leading Italian composers of the day. The first of his two comic works, Lo sposo di tre e marito di nessuna, premiered at a Venetian theatre in November 1783.

Feeling constrained by Italian traditions and eager to experiment, Cherubini travelled to London in 1785, where he produced two opere serie and an opera buffa for the King's Theatre. In the same year, he made an excursion to Paris with his friend, the violinist Giovanni Battista Viotti, who presented him to Marie Antoinette and Parisian society. Cherubini received an important commission to write Démophoon to a French libretto by Jean-François Marmontel that would be his first tragédie en musique. Except for a brief return trip to London and to Turin for an opera seria commissioned by King Victor Amadeus III, Cherubini spent the rest of his life in France where he was initiated into Grand Orient de France "Saint-Jean de Palestine" Masonic Lodge in 1784.

== French assimilation ==
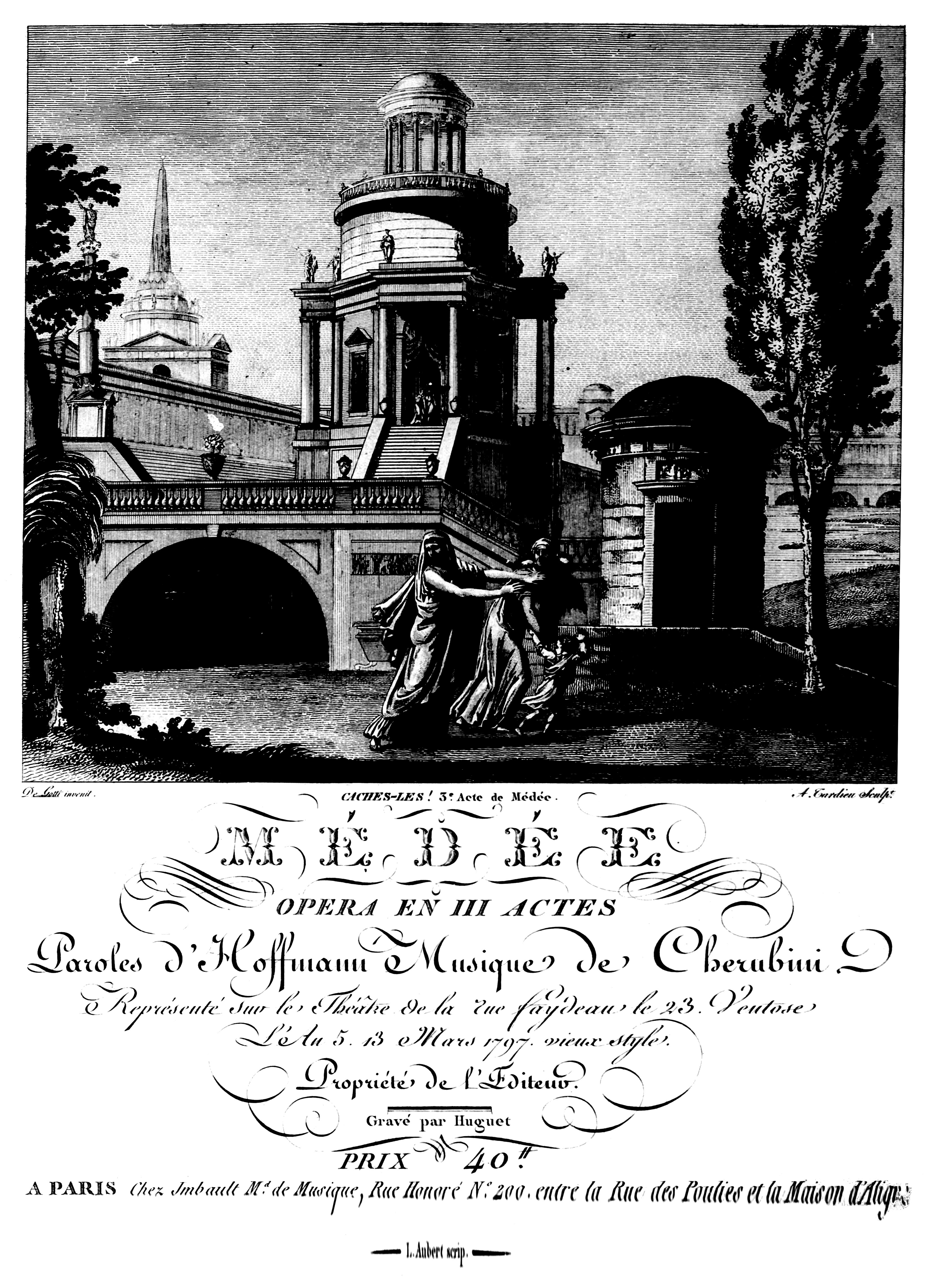
Title page of the first edition of Cherubini's Médée, full score, 1797

Cherubini adopted the French version of his name, Marie-Louis-Charles-Zénobi-Salvador Cherubini; this appears in all extant documents that show his full name after 1790, though his Italian name is now favoured. Performances of Démophoon were favourably received at the Académie Royale de Musique in 1788. With Viotti's help, the Théâtre de Monsieur in the Tuileries appointed Cherubini as its director in 1789. Three years later, after a move to the rue Feydeau and the fall of the monarchy, the company became known as the Théâtre Feydeau. This position gave Cherubini the opportunity to read countless libretti and choose one that best suited his temperament.

Cherubini's music began to show more originality and daring. His first major success was Lodoïska (1791), which was admired for its realistic heroism. This was followed by Elisa (1794), set in the Swiss Alps, and Médée (1797), Cherubini's best-known work. Les deux journées (1800), in which Cherubini simplified his style, was a popular success. These and other operas were premièred at the Théâtre Feydeau or the Opéra-Comique. Feeling financially secure, he married Anne Cécile Tourette in 1794 and began a family of three children.

The fallout from the French Revolution affected Cherubini until the end of his life. Politics forced him to hide his connections with the former aristocracy and seek governmental appointments. Although Napoleon found him too complex, Cherubini wrote at least one patriotic work per year for more than a decade. He was appointed Napoleon's director of music in Vienna for part of 1805 and 1806, whereupon he conducted several of his works in that city.

In 1808 Cherubini was elected an associated member of the Royal Institute of the Netherlands.

== From opera to church music ==
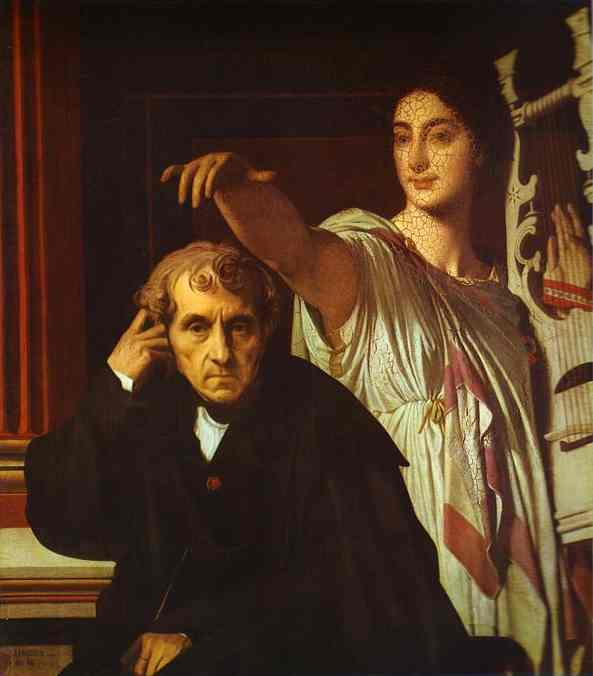
Portrait by Jean-Auguste-Dominique Ingres. The crowning Muse displeased Cherubini and is blacked out in some copies.

After Les deux journées, Parisian audiences began to favour younger composers such as Boieldieu. Cherubini's opera-ballet Anacréon was an outright failure and most stage works after it did not achieve success. Faniska, produced in 1806, was an exception, receiving an enthusiastic response, in particular by Haydn and Beethoven. Les Abencérages (1813), an heroic drama set in Spain during the last days of the Moorish kingdom of Granada, was Cherubini's attempt to compete with Spontini's La vestale; it received critical praise but few performances.

Disappointed with his lack of acclaim in the theatre, Cherubini turned increasingly to church music, writing seven masses, two requiems, and many shorter pieces. During this period (under the restored monarchy), he was appointed Surintendant de la Musique du Roi, a position he would hold until the fall of Charles X (1830). In 1815, London's Royal Philharmonic Society commissioned him to write a symphony, an overture, and a composition for chorus and orchestra, the performances of which he went especially to London to conduct, increasing his fame.

Cherubini's Requiem in C minor (1816), commemorating the anniversary of the execution of King Louis XVI, was a huge success. The work was greatly admired by Beethoven, Schumann and Brahms. In 1836, Cherubini wrote a Requiem in D minor to be performed at his own funeral. It is for a male choir only, as the religious authorities had criticised his use of female voices in the earlier work.

== Later years and legacy ==
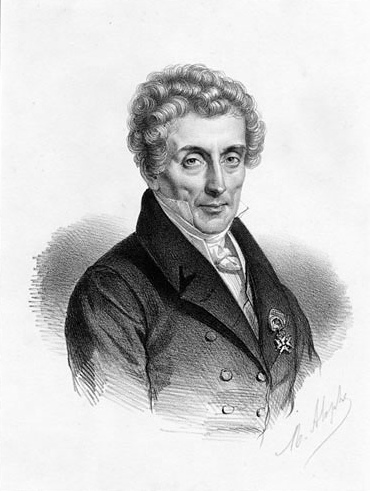
Luigi Cherubini in old age wearing a Légion d'Honneur medal, lithograph by Marie Alexandre Alophe

In 1822, Cherubini became director of the Conservatoire de Paris and completed his textbook, Cours de contrepoint et de fugue, in 1835. His role at the Conservatoire brought him into conflict with the young Hector Berlioz, who portrayed the old composer in his memoirs as a crotchety pedant. Some critics, such as Basil Deane, maintain that Berlioz's depiction has distorted Cherubini's image in posterity. There are many allusions to Cherubini's personal irritability among his contemporaries; Adolphe Adam wrote, "some maintain his temper was very even, because he was always angry". Nevertheless, Cherubini had many friends, including Szymanowska, Rossini, Chopin and, above all, the artist Ingres. The two had mutual interests: Cherubini was a keen amateur painter, and Ingres enjoyed practising the violin. In 1841, Ingres produced the most celebrated portrait of the old composer.

Although chamber music does not make up a large portion of his output, what he did write was important. Wilhelm Altmann, writing in his Handbuch für Streichquartettspieler ("Handbook for String Quartet Players") about Cherubini's six string quartets, stated that they are first-rate and regarded Nos. 1 and 3 as masterworks. His String Quintet for two violins, viola and two cellos is also considered a first-rate work.

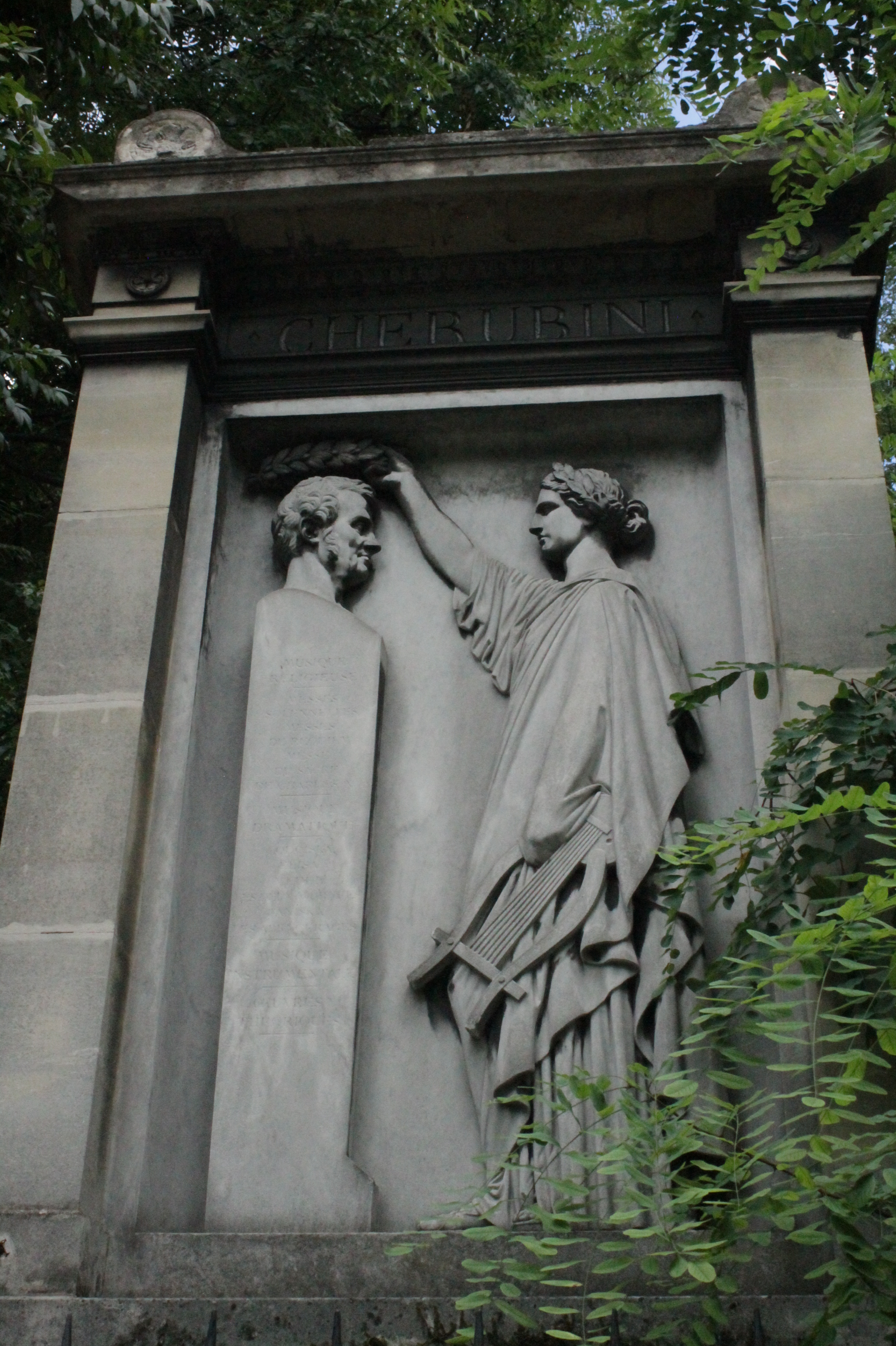
The grave of Cherubini, Père Lachaise Cemetery, Paris, with sculpture by Augustin Dumont

During his lifetime, Cherubini received France's highest and most prestigious honours. These included the Chevalier de la Légion d'honneur (1814) and Membre de l'Académie des Beaux-Arts (1815). In 1841, he was made Commandeur de la Légion d'honneur, the first musician to receive that title.

Cherubini died in Paris in 1842 at age 81 and is buried at Père Lachaise Cemetery, just four metres from his friend Chopin. His tomb was designed by the architect Achille Leclère and includes a figure by the sculptor Augustin-Alexandre Dumont representing "Music" crowning a bust of the composer with a wreath.

== Works ==
=== Orchestral music ===
- Overture in G (1815)
- Symphony in D major (1815)
- Marche funèbre (1820)

=== Chamber music ===
- Two Sonatas for Horn and Strings (1804)
- String Quartet No. 1 in E♭ (1814)
- String Quartet No. 2 in C (1829) - transcription of Symphony in D major with new second movement
- String Quartet No. 3 in D minor (1834)
- String Quartet No. 4 in E (1835)
- String Quartet No. 5 in F (1835)
- String Quartet No. 6 in A minor (1837)
- String Quintet (2 violins, viola, 2 cellos) in E minor (1837)

=== Masses and sections of the Mass ===
- Five masses (written 1773–1776, lost)
- Messe solennelle brève in B♭ (1805, dubious)
- Credo a capella for eight voices and organ (1806)
- Mass in A for three voices (1809, dubious)
- Messe de Chimay in F (1809)
- Messe solenelle No. 2 in D minor (1811) per il Principe Esterházy
- Mass (4th messe solennelle) in C (1816)
- Credo in D (1816)
- Requiem in C minor for mixed chorus (1816) in memory of Louis XVI
- Missa solemnis in E (1818)
- Mass in G (1819) for the Coronation of Louis XVIII
- Mass in B♭ (1821, dubious)
- Messe solennelle in A for the Coronation of Charles X of France (1825)
- Requiem in D minor for male chorus (1836) written for his own funeral

=== Motets and other choral works ===
- Cantata Amphion (1786)
- Cantata Circé (premiered 1789)
- Trois chœrs: Incidental music for the play La Mort de Mirabeau by Jean-Baptiste Pujoulx (1791)
- Cantata Clytemnestra (1794)
- Cantata Hymne au printemps ("Hymn to Spring") (1815)
- Hymne du Panthéon (1794)
- 38 motets

=== Operas ===
- See List of operas by Luigi Cherubini

=== Teaching manuals ===
- A treatise on counterpoint and fugue (1841)
