= Mélesville =

French dramatist

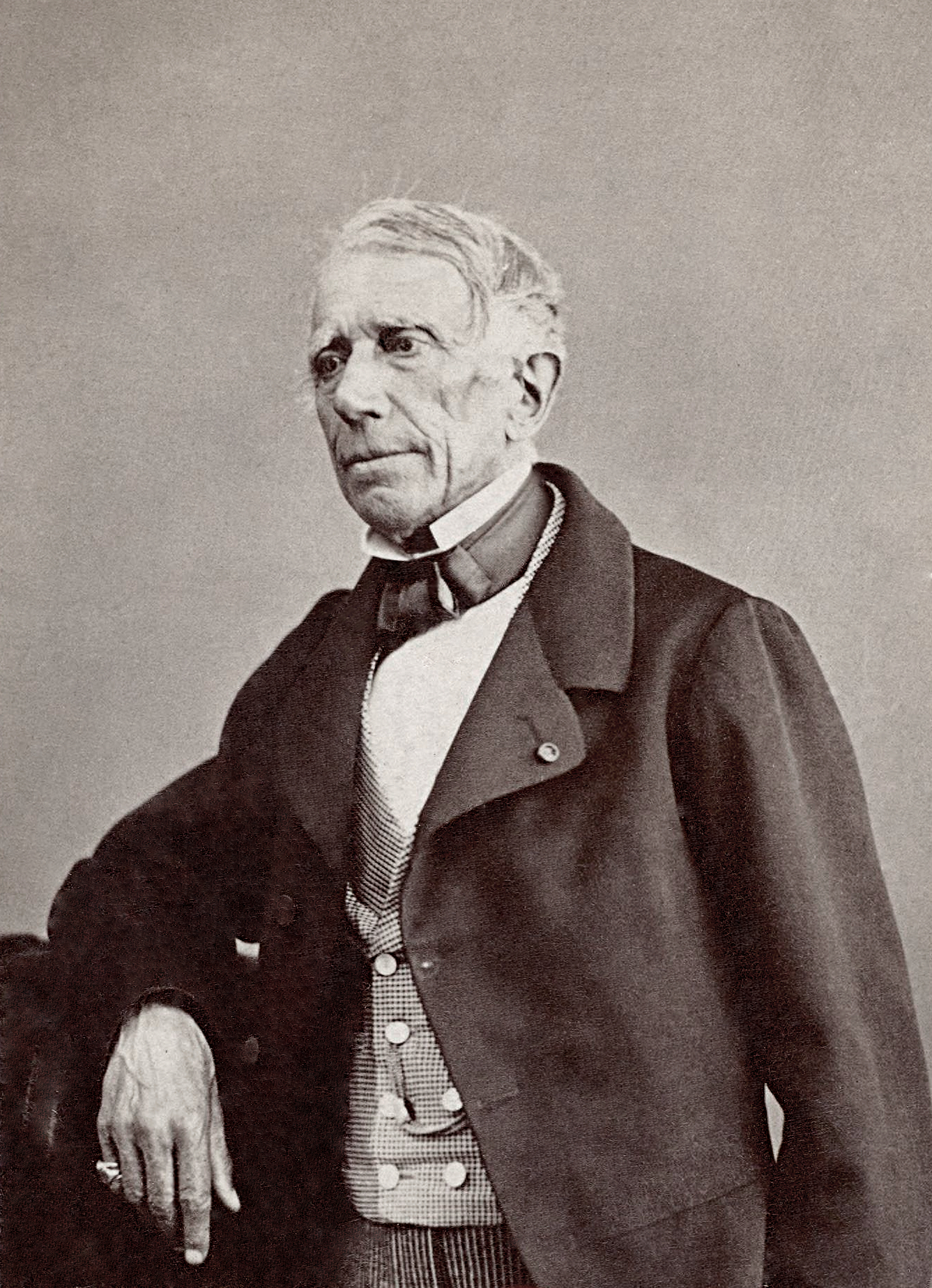
Mélesville

Baron Anne-Honoré-Joseph Duveyrier, pen-name Mélesville (13 December 1787 in Paris – 7 November 1865 in Marly-le-Roi) was a French dramatist. The playwright Mélesville fils was his son.

== Life ==
The son of Honoré-Nicolas-Marie Duveyrier, Mélesville initially had success at the bar and as a magistrate. He left the legal profession in 1814 to dedicate himself to the theatre, though he had first gained praise in that area in 1811 for his comedy l'Oncle rival. Out of consideration for his father's position, he wrote under the pseudonym Mélesville, by which he is still known.

He wrote in all genres - dramas, melodramas, comedies, vaudevilles, opera librettos - and is the sole or collaborative author of more than 340 plays. His collaborators included Eugène Scribe and Delestre-Poirson, with the collective pseudonym of Amédée de Saint-Marc. He collaborated with the more famous authors Brazier, Carmouche, Bayard, Scribe, Léon Laya on over 500 plays, some of which enjoyed great success. It was with Scribe that he enjoyed his most consistent successes, on genre pieces, thanks to the pieces' design and to their wit, happy words and well-observed detail. He also wrote with Dumersan and Théaulon. As a librettist, he notably collaborated with Auber and Adam; he was also librettist for Ferdinand Hérold's comic opera Zampa. Ignaz Brüll's most successful opera, Das goldene Kreuz (The Golden Cross), was also based on a story by Mélesville.

== Sources ==
- Vapereau, Gustave (1876). Dictionnaire universal des littératures, 1: conténant... Hachette et cie. p. 687.
