= List of operas by Ferdinando Paer =

This is a complete list of operas by Ferdinando Paer (1771–1839).

== List ==
Title	Genre	Subdivisions	Libretto	Première date	Place, theatre
Orphée et Euridice (Paer)	play with songs	1 act	Charles Pierre Duplessis after Ranieri de' Calzabigi and Alessandro Striggio figlio	1791	Parma, Court
Circe (also performed as Calypso)	opera	3 acts	Domenico Perelli	carnival 1792	Venice, Teatro San Samuele
Le astuzie amorose, o Il tempo fa giustizia a tutti (also performed as La locanda dei vagabondi)	dramma giocoso	2 acts	Antonio Brambilla	autumn 1792	Parma, Teatro Ducale
I portenti del magnetismo	opera buffa	2 acts		carnival 1793	Venice, Teatro San Moisè
Icilio e Virginia		2 acts	Giuseppe Maria Foppa	June 1793	Padua, Nuovo
Laodicea (also performed as Tegene e Laodicea)		3 acts	Giuseppe Maria Foppa	June 1793	Padua, Nuovo
I pretendenti burlati	dramma giocoso	2 acts	Gian Carlo Grossardi	summer 1793	Medesano, Teatrino
L'oro fa tutto (German: Geld ist die Lösung)	dramma giocoso	2 acts	Angelo Anelli	August 1793	Milan, Teatro alla Scala
Il nuovo Figaro (also performed as Il matrimonio di Figaro)	dramma giocoso	4 acts	Lorenzo Da Ponte after Pierre Beaumarchais (originally written for Wolfgang Amadeus Mozart)	January 1794	Parma, Teatro Ducale
Il matrimonio improvviso (also performed as I due sordi)	farsa	1 act	Giuseppe Maria Foppa	22 February 1794	Venice, Teatro San Moisè
I molinari	farsa	1 act	Giuseppe Maria Foppa	Carnival 1794	Venice, Teatro San Moisè
Il fornaro	farsa	1 act		carnival 1794	Venice, Teatro San Moisè
L'Idomeneo	dramma serio	2 acts	Gaetano Sertor after Antoine Danchet	spring 1794	Florence, Palla a Corda
Ero e Leandro	dramma	2 acts		13 August 1794	Naples, Teatro di San Carlo
L'inganno in trionfo	intermezzo	1 act		1794	Florence, Palla a Corda
Una in bene e una in male (also performed as Le astuzie di Patacca)	dramma giocoso	2 acts	Giuseppe Maria Foppa	1794	Rome, Valle
La Rossana	melodramma serio	3 acts	Aurelio Aureli	carnival 1795	Milan, Teatro alla Scala
Il Cinna	melodramma serio	2 acts	Angelo Anelli	13 June 1795	Padua, Nuovo
Anna	opera buffa	2 acts		June 1795	Padua, Nuovo
L'intrigo amoroso (also performed as Saed, ossia Gl'intrighi del serraglio and Il male vien dal buco)	dramma giocoso	2 acts	Giovanni Bertati	4 December 1795	Venice, Teatro San Moisè
L'orfana riconosciuta	dramma giocoso			2 April 1796	Florence, Pergola
L'amante servitore	commedia in musica	2 acts	Antonio Simeone Sografi	26 December 1796	Venice, Teatro San Moisè
Il principe di Taranto (also performed as La contadina fortunata)	dramma giocoso	2 acts	Filippo Livigni	11 February 1797	Parma, Teatro Ducale
Il fanatico in Berlina				1797	Vienna, Kärntnertortheater
Griselda, ossia La virtù al cimento	dramma semiserio	2 acts	Angelo Anelli after Giovanni Boccaccio	January 1798	Parma, Teatro Ducale
Camilla, ossia Il sotteraneo	dramma semiserio	3 acts	Giuseppe Carpani, after Benoît-Joseph Marsollier des Vivetières' libretto Camille for Nicolas Dalayrac	28 February 1799	Vienna, Kärntnertortheater
Il maestro di ballo	farsa	1 act	Giuseppe Maria Foppa	carnival 1799	Venice, Teatro San Moisè
Il morto vivo	opera buffa	2 acts	Carlo Prospero Defranceschi	12 July 1799	Vienna, Kärntnertortheater
La testa riscaldata	farsa	1 act	Giuseppe Maria Foppa	20 January 1800	Venice, Teatro San Benedetto
La sonnambula	farsa	1 act	Giuseppe Maria Foppa	15 February 1800	Venice, Teatro San Benedetto
Ginevra degli Almieri	opera tragicomica	4 acts	Giuseppe Maria Foppa	2 September 1800	Vienna, Kärntnertortheater
Poche ma buone, ossia Le donne cambiate (German: Der lustige Schuster)	opera buffa	2 acts	Giuseppe Maria Foppa	18 December 1800	Vienna, Kärntnertortheater
Achille	melodramma eroico	2 acts	Giovanni De Gamerra, after Homer	6 June 1801	Vienna, Kärntnertortheater
I fuorusciti di Firenze	opera semiseria	2 acts	Angelo Anelli	27 November 1802	Dresden, Hoftheater
Sargino, ossia L'allievo dell'amore	dramma eroicomico	2 acts	Giuseppe Maria Foppa	26 May 1803	Dresden, Hoftheater
Lodoiska	dramma eroico	3 acts	Francesco Gonella after Jean-Baptiste Louvet de Couvray	summer 1804	Bologna, Teatro Comunale
Leonora, ossia L'amore conjugale	dramma semiserio	2 acts	Giovanni Schmidt, after Jean-Nicolas Bouilly's libretto Léonore for Pierre Gaveaux	3 October 1804	Dresden, Hoftheater
Sofonisba	dramma serio	2 acts	Giovanni Schmidt	19 May 1805	Bologna, Corso
Il maniscalco	dramma giocoso			summer 1805	Florence, Palla a Corda
Numa Pompilio	dramma serio	3 acts	Pietro Bagnoli, after Matteo Noris	carnival 1808	Paris, Tuileries
Cleopatra				1808	Paris
Diana e Endimione, ossia Il ritardo	intermezzo		Stefano Vestris	autumn 1809	Paris, Tuileries
Agnese	dramma semiserio	2 acts	Luigi Buonavoglia after Filippo Casari	October 1809	Parma, Villa Douglas-Scotti, Ponte d'Attaro
La Didone abbandonata	melodramma serio	2 acts	Metastasio	1810	Paris, Tuileries
Un pazzo ne fa cento	opera buffa	2 acts		autumn 1812	Florence, Pergola
I Baccanti	opera seria	2 acts	Gaetano Rossi	7 January 1813	Paris, Tuileries
Poche ma buone, ossia La moglie ravveduta	farsa comica	1 act	Giovanni De Gamerra	summer 1813	Rome, Valle
L'oriflamme (written in collaboration with Henri-Montan Berton, Rodolphe Kreutzer and Étienne Méhul)	opéra	1 act	Charles-Guillaume Etienne and Louis-Pierre-Marie-François Baour-Lormian	1 February 1814	Paris, Opéra
Oro non compra amore	opera buffa	2 acts		1814	Pavia, Quattro Signori
L'eroismo in amore	melodramma serio	2 acts	Luigi Romanelli	26 December 1815	Milan, La Scala
La primavera felice	opera giocosa	1 act	Luigi Balocchi	5 July 1816	Paris, Italien
Le maître de chapelle, ou Le souper imprévu	opéra comique	2 acts	Sophie Gay, after Alexandre Duval	29 March 1821	Paris, Théâtre Feydeau
Blanche de Provence, ou La cour des fées (written in collaboration with Henri-Montan Berton, François-Adrien Boieldieu, Luigi Cherubini and Rodolphe Kreutzer)	opéra	3 acts	Emmanuel Théaulon and Armand Jean Le Bouthillier de Rancé	1 May 1821	Paris, Tuileries
La marquise de Brinvilliers (written in collaboration with Daniel Auber, Désiré-Alexandre Batton, Henri-Montan Berton, Giuseppe Felice Blangini, François-Adrien Boieldieu, Michele Carafa, Luigi Cherubini and Ferdinand Hérold)	opéra comique	3 acts	Eugène Scribe and Castile-Blaze	31 October 1831	Paris, Opéra-Comique (Salle Ventadour)
Un caprice de femme	opéra comique	1 act	Jean-Pierre Lesguillon	23 July 1834	Paris, Opéra-comique (Salle de la Bourse)

== Sources ==
- Budden, Julian (1992), 'Paer, Ferdinando' in The New Grove Dictionary of Opera, ed. Stanley Sadie (London) ISBN 0-333-73432-7
