= Heinefetter =

Heinefetter is a surname. Notable people with the surname include:

- Johann Baptist Heinefetter (1815–1902), German Romantic painter
- Kathinka Heinefetter (1819–1858), German operatic soprano
- Klara Stöckl-Heinefetter (1816–1857), German operatic soprano
- Sabine Heinefetter (1809–1872), German operatic soprano
