= Jean-Blaise Martin =

French opera singer

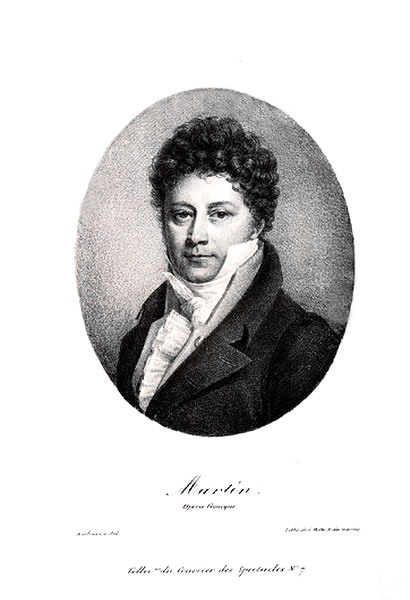
Jean-Blaise Martin

Jean-Blaise Martin, full name Nicolas Jean-Blaise Martin (24 February 1768 in Paris – 28 October 1837 in Tourzel-Ronzières) was a French opera singer whose tessitura lay between tenor and baritone, which became later known as "baryton-martin".

== Life and career ==
Jean-Blaise Martin began singing publicly as a child, before his voice broke. He made his professional operatic debut in 1789, at the Théâtre Feydeau, in Paris, in a parody called Le Marquis de Tulipano. He then studied with Madame Dugazon, and made his debut at the Opéra-Comique in 1794, and sang there until 1823. He became a member of the theatre's administrative committee in 1801. He also taught at the Conservatoire de Musique of Paris, from 1825 to 1837.

He composed one opéra comique, Les oiseaux de mer, produced at the Théâtre Feydeau in 1796.

During his career, he created some 15 roles in operas by Nicolas Dalayrac, François Devienne, André Grétry, Étienne Méhul, Nicolas Isouard, Ferdinando Paer, etc.

Martin's voice was described as a "ténor grave et sombre", meaning a deep-voiced dark tenor, or as a "baryton aigu et clair", meaning a clear-voiced high baritone; the compass was E flat to a, with a falsetto extension to a'. His vocal type became known as baryton-martin, most often found in French operetta. Modern examples of this voice type include French baritone Michel Dens, and more recently Bernard Sinclair, who can be heard in a few operetta recordings such as La fille de Madame Angot, Les cloches de Corneville, and Valses de Vienne.

In the operatic repertoire, the most famous role for baryton-martin is Pelléas in Claude Debussy's Pelléas et Mélisande. Camille Maurane and Jacques Jansen are widely recognized as having been the best exponents of the role.

== Roles created ==
- 1804: A bard in Ossian, ou Les bardes by Jean-François Le Sueur
- 1821: Barnabé in Le maître de chapelle by Ferdinando Paer

== Sources ==
- Roland Mancini and Jean-Jacques Rouveroux, (orig. H. Rosenthal and J. Warrack, French edition), Guide de l’opéra, Les indispensables de la musique (Fayard, 1995). ISBN 2-213-59567-4
