= The Golden Pot =

1814 novella by E. T. A. Hoffmann

The Golden Pot: A Modern Fairy Tale (German: Der goldne Topf. Ein Märchen aus der neuen Zeit) is a novella by E. T. A. Hoffmann, first published in 1814 and revised by the author in 1819. Hoffmann regarded it as his best story, and there is wide agreement among literary scholars that it is a masterpiece of Romantic literature.

== Plot summary ==
The novella, which comprises twelve "vigils" (chapters, literally "night watches"), begins with the clumsy student Anselmus running through the Black Gate in Dresden, where he knocks over the basket of wares of an old applemonger, scattering them in all directions. To mitigate the old woman's rage, he gives her all the money in his purse and runs away. She reviles him prophetically with the words "Yes, run! Run, you child of Satan! Run into the crystal which will soon be your downfall." He flees and stops under an elderberry bush near Lincke’sches Bad. From his refuge in the bush, he hears melodious voices like the sounds of crystal bells. He looks up and finds himself looking into the blue eyes of a snake, which he falls in love with instantly. When the snake disappears soon after, he is beside himself and confused.

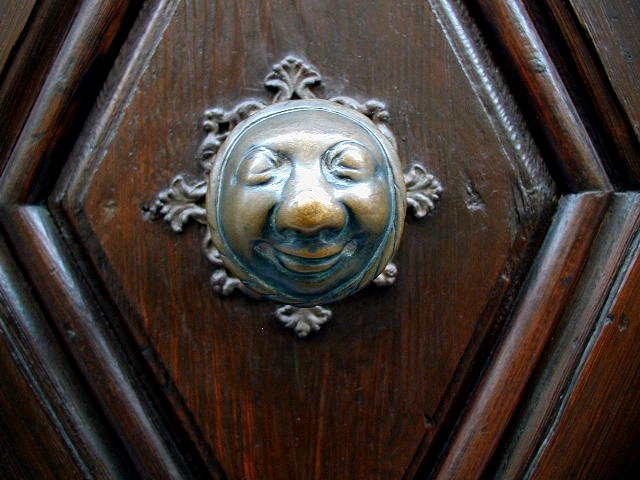
Apfelweibla (Applemonger), a doorknob in Bamberg's old city

Anselmus later chances to meet his friend, Assistant Headmaster Paulmann, who invites him to his home. There he meets Paulmann's sixteen-year-old daughter Veronika, who falls in love with him; she dreams of a future with the "privy councillor" Anselmus. He also meets Registrar Heerbrand, who gets him a job as a copier of old manuscripts for Archivist Lindhorst, an eccentric alchemist and magician. He is to be paid for this work so as to compensate for the loss of his purse to the applemonger. However, as he is about to begin his first day of work there, he sees the old woman's face in the bronze doorknob of his workplace and faints out of fright.

A few days later, Anselmus happens across the archivist in an open field, who impresses him with his magic skills and reveals to him that the snake that Anselmus saw and fell in love with is his daughter Serpentina. Furthermore, Lindhorst tells a strange story from his family. It is about Phosphorus (which means "the shining one"), a beautiful fire lily, and the dragon which Phosphorus has to fight. Anselmus begins his work the following day. His work consists of making exact copies of Arabic and Coptic texts that he cannot decipher. The Archivist warns him explicitly that he must not spot any of the originals with ink from his pen. Fortunately, Anselmus obtains help from Serpentina and is able to perform his duties impeccably.

The more he works with the manuscripts the more familiar he becomes with them, until one day he copies a document that he can understand. It turns out to be the story of Archivist Lindhorst, who in reality is a salamander, the Elemental Spirit of Fire, who has been banished from the legendary Land of Atlantis by Phosphorus, the Prince of Spirits, and must enter mankind's prosaic existence on Earth. To compensate for his offences and to be allowed to return to Atlantis, the Salamander must find loving "childlike and poetic" husbands for his three snake daughters. The Salamander owns three radiant golden pots, given to him by the Elemental Spirit of the Earth, which are to be his daughters' dowries. Serpentina assures Anselmus that her dowry will ensure their happiness together.

Veronika, who fears that she will lose Anselmus (and her future as "Mrs Privy Councillor"), turns for help to the old applemonger (in the guise of a friendly old woman), who produces a magic metal mirror for her during the night of the autumn equinox. Later, as Anselmus gazes into this mirror, its magic powers cause him to think that Serpentina and the story of the Salamander are merely products of his imagination, and he falls in love with Veronika. He promises to marry her as soon as he becomes a Court Councilor.

As he subsequently attempts to copy another of Lindhorst's manuscripts, it appears alien to him, and he accidentally splashes the original with ink. As punishment, the enraged Archivist uses a spell to imprison him in a crystal bottle on a shelf in his library. Anselmus subsequently discovers that he is among several other bottles, which are occupied by other men who previously worked for Lindhorst.

A short time later, a witch (the applemonger) appears and attempts to steal the golden pot that was a present from the Earth Elemental Spirit to the Salamander. Archivist Lindhorst enters with his parrot, and they together fiercely battle the witch and her black cat. Lindhorst and the parrot are victorious, and the vanquished witch is transformed into a beet, her true form. The Archivist realizes that Anselmus had been under the influence of a "hostile principle," forgives him, and frees him from the bottle.

In the penultimate vigil of the novella, Veronika accepts a marriage proposal from Heerbrand, who meanwhile has become a Court Councillor instead of Anselmus. In the final vigil, Hoffmann employs an unusual narrative device. The narrator, who previously has told the story from a 3rd-person perspective, inserts himself into the tale and reports to the reader on the difficulty he is having in bringing his account to an end. He receives and shares with the reader a letter from Archivist Lindhorst. From the letter, the reader learns that Anselmus has married Serpentina and now lives happily with her on the country estate of the Salamander in Atlantis. The Salamander himself, however, must wait until his other two daughters are married before he can return to Atlantis.

Lindhorst invites the narrator to his study, where the narrator has a vision of Serpentina leaving a temple with the golden pot in her hands. From the pot has sprung a bright lily that represents the love, happiness, and fulfillment of the young couple. Anselmus, in his rapture, exclaims that the lily represents "knowledge of the sacred harmony of all things." The story ends with the Archivist comforting the narrator, who envies the happy Anselmus, by saying that every human being has access to "poesie", in which the "sacred harmony of all being is revealed as the deepest secret of nature".

== Origins ==
The Golden Pot was written between the summer of 1813 and February 15, 1814, and was first published in 1814 as the third volume of the anthology Fantasy Pieces in Callot's Manner [Fantasiestücke in Callots Manier]. The title of the anthology references Jacques Callot (1592-1635), who executed brilliantly detailed etchings and drawings in the baroque style.

=== Life influences ===
Letters, diary entries, and essays that Hoffmann wrote as he was working on The Golden Pot indicate that it was written during one of the most unsettled periods of his life. During his stay in Dresden, where he was working as a music director, he witnessed the death, hunger, and disease that were the result of the bloody battles fought between the troops of Napoleon and those of the Allies (Prussia, Austria, and Russia).

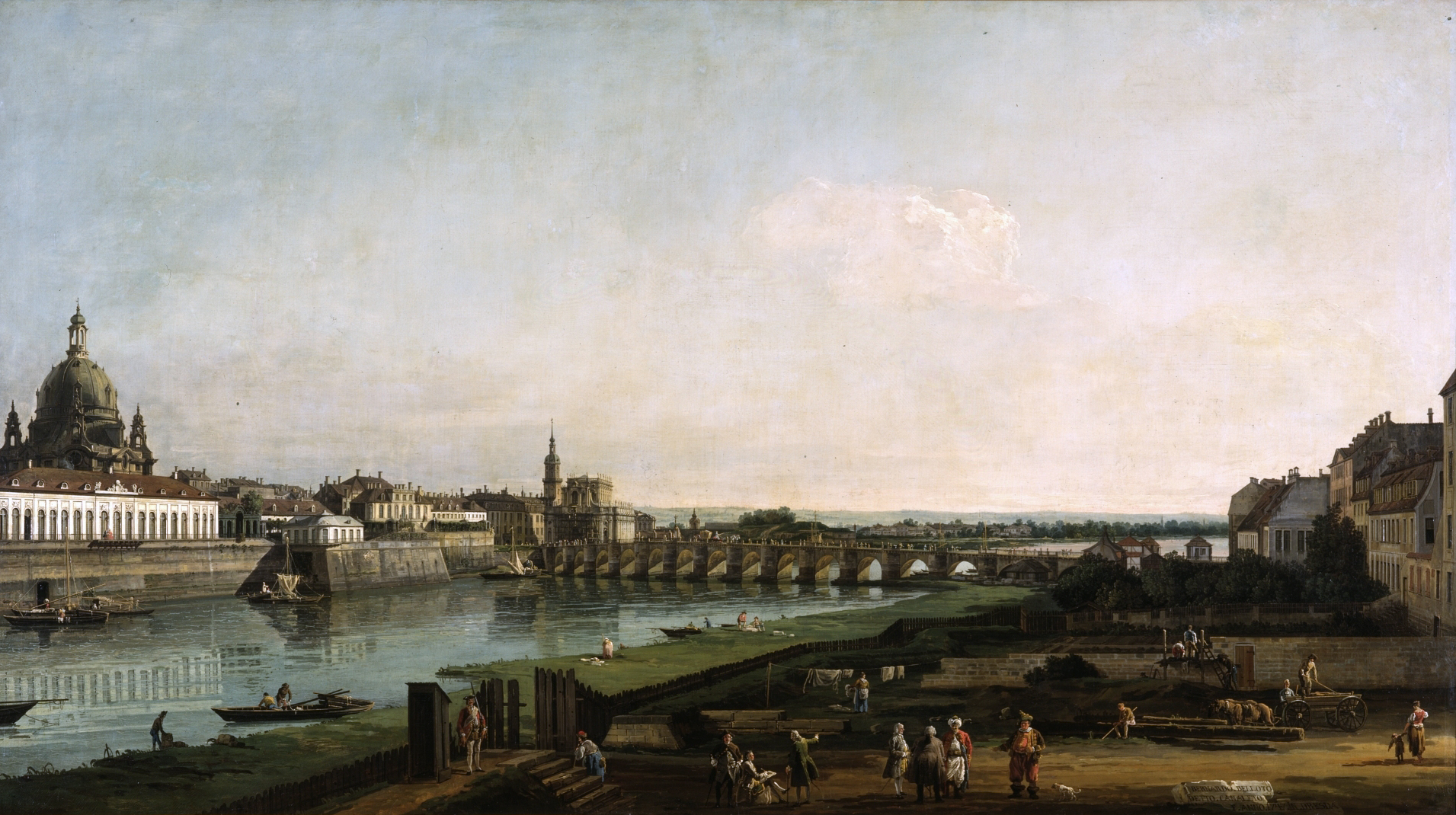
Dresden seen from the right bank of the River Elbe above the Augustus Bridge. Painting by Bernardo Bellotto, called Canaletto, 1747

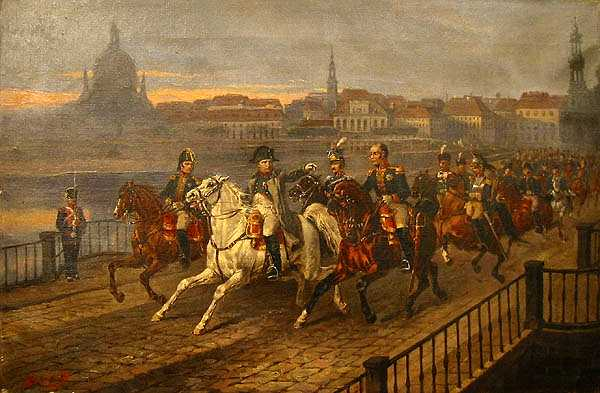
Napoleon crossing the Elbe. Painting by Józef Brodowski, 1895

In a letter that reports on the terrible conditions in Dresden and his own impaired health, Hoffmann admits that it is the menacing external conditions that have allowed him access to the marvelous world of The Golden Pot:

"Never before this dark and fateful time, in which one lives a day-to-day existence and is happy to have it, has writing so attracted me. It is as though a wondrous kingdom has opened itself to me, a kingdom that originates within me and, as it takes shape, removes me from the stress of external events."

In this letter of 1813 Hoffmann also sketches out his concept for The Golden Pot in some detail:

"I have been exceedingly busy with the continuation of [the Fantasy Pieces], primarily a fairy tale that will take up most of an entire volume. Do not think for a moment, good Sir, of Scheherazade and one thousand and one nights--turbans and Turkish trousers have been banned completely. I intend the entire fairy tale to step into everyday life and there to assume its shapes in a manner that is fairylike and wondrous but at the same time bold. For example, . . . the youth . . . falls eternally and madly in love with one of the green snakes. He . . . marries her and receives as a dowry a golden chamber pot that is studded with jewels. The first time he pisses in it he is transformed into a meerkat, etc."

Hoffmann's letter indicates that he originally planned a shallow, joking story. He later revised this concept to make his tale deeper and more serious. Passages from other letters written in 1813 suggest that this change was brought about by a process that Hoffmann describes as a continuing opening of his internal self. He concerns himself more and more with his own past, with the aim of coming to grips with wrongs he feels he has suffered; that is, he is going through what has been called a process of mourning. The author increasingly writes himself into his story, and the finished work contains a number of autobiographical allusions and references to contemporary events and places in Dresden. The subtitle of the novella (A Modern Fairy Tale) likely is a reflection of this. With The Golden Pot, Hoffmann has consciously invented a new literary genre. In contrast to the traditional fairy tale, the “modern fairy tale” takes place in a contemporary setting that would be recognizable to any citizen of Dresden in the nineteenth century. Although the final story was more serious than the one originally planned, The Golden Pot still contains a great deal of humor.

=== Influences of published works ===
The "deepening" of The Golden Pot probably also was influenced by published works that Hoffmann is known to have read shortly before and during the period of his work on the novella. Important appears to be Gotthilf Heinrich von Schubert's Views on the Night Side of the Natural Sciences [Ansichten von der Nachtseite der Naturwissenschaften]. The theories of the romantic mythologist and linguist Johann Arnold Kannes, and Friedrich Wilhelm Joseph Schelling's Ideas for a Philosophy of Nature as Introduction to the Study of this Science [Ideen zu einer Philosophie der Natur als Einleitung in das Studium dieser Wissehschaft] also appear to have had an influence on The Golden Pot. Hoffmann also read Montfaucon de Villar's Count of Gabalis or Conversations on the Hidden Sciences [Le Comte de Gabalis ou Entretiens des Sciences Secrètes], from which he clearly derived material for his depiction of the elemental spirits.

=== Operatic influences ===
The plot of Hoffmann's fairy tale may have been influenced by his experience in the theater, which began in 1808. Wolfgang Amadeus Mozart's opera The Magic Flute was one of the many operas that Hoffmann conducted during the period in which he wrote The Golden Pot. In the opera, Tamino must survive tests imposed by Sarastro, a wise magician, if he is to win her. The wise old Sarastro resembles Archivist Lindhorst in this regard, and Sarastro also has a female foe, the Queen of the Night, who is Pamina's mother, comparing to the applemonger, who was Veronika's wardress. Like the applemonger, the Queen is associated with both the night and the lowly realm of the earth. Tamino, like Anselmus, must learn the differences between a wise, majestic mentor and a female personification of evil.

Hoffmann's work on one of his own operas, Undine, which he composed in Dresden between 1812 and 1814, may also have influenced The Golden Pot. Based on a story by Friedrich de la Motte Fouqué, the opera is the story of a water nymph who gains an immortal soul by winning the love of a human being.

=== Influencing other works ===
The transformation of Lindhorst's bronze knocker into the face of the Applewoman is echoed in Charles Dickens' A Christmas Carol when Ebenezer Scrooge sees Jacob Marley's face in his own door knocker.

It has been speculated that The Golden Pot was an influence for Joseph Smith when authoring the origin story for how he created The Book of Mormon. This was first suggested in the 2002 book An Insider’s View of Mormon Origins, written by Grant H. Palmer. However, this theory was dependent on the authenticity of the Salamander Letter, which proved to be a forgery. Nonetheless, Palmer has never repudiated his theory.

== Analysis ==
The Golden Pot is widely viewed as a product of the romantic imagination. Indeed, the novella shows many of the characteristics commonly associated with romanticism in general and German romanticism in particular: imagination, instincts, and feelings are afforded more importance than logical reason. Also, the reconciliation of opposites and the harmony of nature are central ideals, symbolism and myth play prominent roles, preference is given to boldness and suggestiveness over absolute clarity and decorum, and the poetic is elevated above the prosaic.

Hoffmann certainly shares the contempt of other romantics for the philistine, but he considers the smugness, narrow-mindedness, contentment, and banality of the bourgeoisie to be elements that must be drawn into the wondrous realm of the imagination, not things to be reviled. In The Golden Pot, art and love spring from lives empty of color, beauty, and enthusiasm. Anselmus and the narrator, who steps out of his role to become a character in the story, are able to break free of the world of the middle class and enter Atlantis. Associate Headmaster Paulmann and Registrar Heerbrand belong to the philistine world but are not portrayed as hostile or blameworthy. They are depicted, rather, as convivial, benevolent, and generous. They will not enter Atlantis, but they do at least approach the world of imagination when they compose their songs and drink their intoxicating punch. Veronika enters the world of magic when she avails herself of the service of the applemonger, even though she later withdraws from this world completely to become the proud wife of a privy councilor.

== Adaptations ==
- The opera The Golden Pot premiered in 1941.
- The Golden Pot was one of three Hoffmann tales depicted in the 2018 Russian stop-motion film Hoffmaniada.

== Sources ==
- Feldges, Brigitte (1986). E.T.A. Hoffmann : Epoche, Werk, Wirkung (in German). Munich: Beck. ISBN 9783406312410.
- Kaiser, Gerhard R (1988). E.T.A. Hoffmann (in German). Stuttgart: J.B. Metzler. ISBN 9783476102430.
