= Johann Baptist Heinefetter =

German painter (1815–1902)

Johann Baptist Heinefetter (2 April 1815 – 4 November 1902) was a German Romantic painter.

== Life ==
Heinefetters was born as the child of Jewish parents in Mainz. From the union of his father Christian Heinefetter (born 1772) and his mother Christine (née Seelandt) further children emerged, so the sisters Sabine, Eva, Fatime, Kathinka, Klara and Nanette, who were all opera singers. Together with Adolph Heinefetter the whole family took part in the opera The Magic Flute in Staatstheater Mainz in 1826.

In Munich, Heinefetter became a pupil of the war artist Dietrich Monten. He was active as genre, landscape and occasionally also battle painter. He travelled to Italy, Southern France, Corsica, Switzerland, Tyrol as well as Austria, Upper Bavaria, the Black Forest and the Rhine-Main area and settled in Baden-Baden.

In 1842, he painted with Jakob Götzenberger the frescos of the Trinkhalle Baden-Baden, created the picture Resurrection of Christ for the cemetery chapel and in the Jesuitenkolleg Baden-Baden four large ceiling paintings. In Baden-Baden he founded a gymnastics club in 1847, to whose honorary member he was later appointed. In the 1850s, he accompanied Götzenberger to England. Here they worked together for Francis Egerton, 1st Earl of Ellesmere, who let them decorate the Bridgewater House in the London St James's Park with pictures from the history of the house and scenes from Comus by John Milton.

He was painting teacher of the princesses Belosselski and the Gagarin family and the Duchess of Hamilton Princess Marie Amelie of Baden. Also Frederick I, Grand Duke of Baden showed interest in Heinefetter's works and visited the artist's studio several times. He acquired several large landscape paintings and appointed Heinefetter as Court painter.
