= Johannes Gelbke =

German-American composer

Johannes Woldemar Gelbke (19 July 1846 – 1 March 1903) was a German composer, choir lieder, conductor and singer He became known especially in Germany for his song Horch! Die alten Eichen rauschen... ("Heimkehr"). He also worked as a composer, conductor, choirmaster and singer in the US, where he lived and worked from 1882.

== Life ==
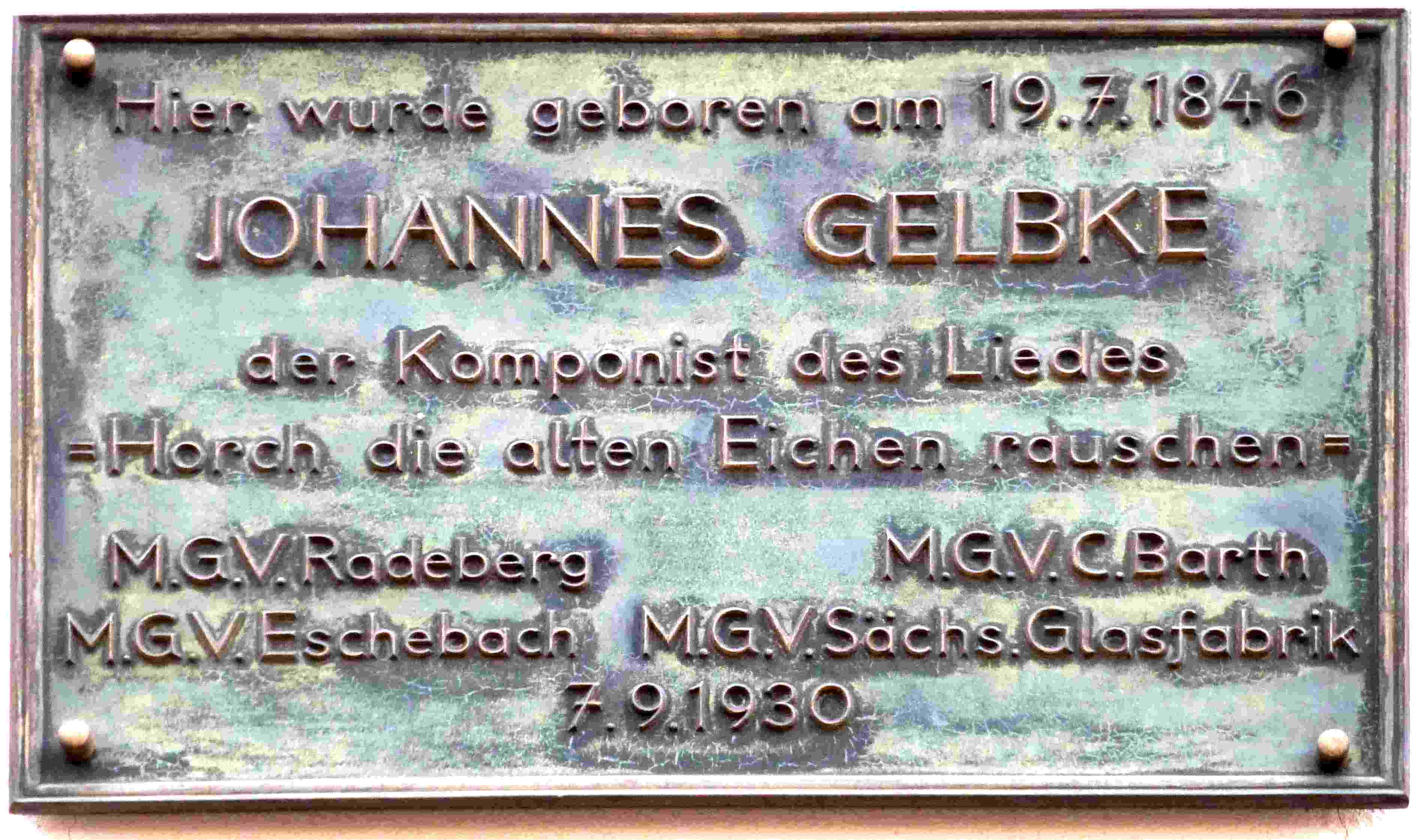
Memorial plaque on Gelbke's birthplace, inaugurated 1930

Gelbke was born in Radeberg. Father Ernst Ludwig Gelbke (1812 Radeberg - unknown) was "veterinarian and company blacksmith in the local Königl. Sächs. Brigade Reiter Artillerie" in the Radeberg garrison. On the recommendation of his teachers, Johannes was admitted to the Gymnasium zum heiligen Kreuz Dresden after attending the Radeberg primary school. (Kreuzschule) as boarding school pupil and because of his excellent soprano voice he was accepted into the alumnae choir (Dresdner Kreuzchor). The cantor of the Kreuzchor at the time and composer Ernst Julius Otto quickly recognised the boy's musical abilities, introduced him to the ecclesiastical Tonkunst and gave him lessons in music theory.

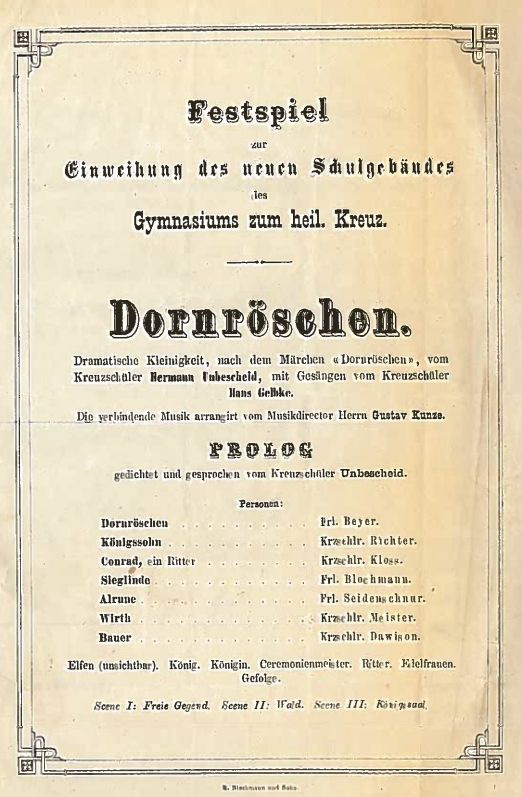
Title page to Gelbke's Singspiel Dornröschen 1866

Already here, the young Gelbke composed songs and church choir.

No specific information is available about his numerous compositions from 1882 onwards in Buffalo.

On 30 April 1866, the eve of the consecration of the new building of the Kreuzschule on Dresden's Georgplatz, the "Dramatische Kleinigkeit: Dornröschen" (Little Drama: Sleeping Beauty) was premiered in the hall of the famous Lincke’sches Bad, a Singspiel written by Kreuzschule pupil Hermann Unbescheid (later Studienrat and Prof. Dr.) and set to music by Gelbke. On the evening of the consecration day, 1 May 1866, the performance was repeated in the presence of the King and the Saxon princes. This success was the motive for Gelbke, a pupil at the Kreuzschule, to devote himself entirely to music after taking his Abitur in 1868.

Gelbke went to Leipzig in 1868 and attended the Königliche Konservatorium der Musik in composition, theory and piano. He took his exams with Ignaz Moscheles. His teachers in theory and composition included Thomaskantor Prof. Friedrich Richter and Oscar Paul. At the University of Leipzig Gelbke was a guest lecturer in historical musicology and acoustics. With this solid education, he became a music teacher (singing and piano) in Leipzig and worked as a singing association conductor. From 1869 onwards, he also directed several choral societies in Wurzen.

In 1882 Gelbke received an offer from Buffalo to take over the conducting position of the renowned "Orpheus" singing society in the new "Music Hall Buffalo". Buffalo was a centre of ethnic German emigrants in the US, who continued to intensively cultivate their German traditions here, including German song. He left Germany on 22 November 1882 and began his conducting career in Buffalo on 14 December 1882.

The home of Gelbke's choral society "Orpheus", the "New Music Hall Buffalo", burned down in March 1885, whereupon Gelbke handed over the direction of the choir to Carl Adam in November 1885. Gelbke was the conductor of the Buffalo Sängerbund for several years and also conducted the Central Sängerbund, which was made up of 12 regional choral societies, the Mendelssohn Club, the Beethoven Club, the choral section of the Buffalo Turnverein and many other choirs and choral societies. From 1884 to 1894 he was conductor of the "Niagara Falls Orpheus". At the "23rd North American Music Festival" in Buffalo in 1883, in which 72 choirs with 2,100 singers participated, Gelbke conducted the choir of the Sängerbund with 600 singers with great success. He also worked for the "Liedertafel" Buffalo. As director of the renowned singing society "Harugari Frohsinn" he led it artistically to high blossom. Gelbke earned his income as a private music teacher.

On 27 December 1887, he married Mathilde née Hütter, born in Buffalo in 1856, the daughter of a family of German lawyers.

Gelbke died on 1 March 1903 in Buffalo of a myocardial infarction at age 56. The German-language newspaper Buffalo Freie Presse honoured him already on 2 March 1903 with a detailed obituary.

== Work ==
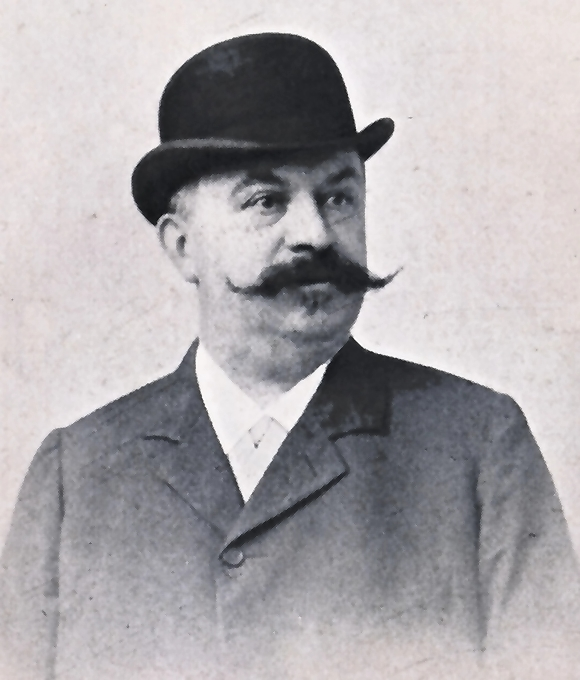
Emil Schimpke

His best-known work in Germany is probably the setting of the poem Heimkehr by Emil Schimpke, which is still mainly sung today by male choirs and quartets under the song title "Horch, die alten Eichen rauschen". Contrary to other sources and traditions, according to which Gelbke is said to have created this composition on the occasion of a later visit to his hometown of Radeberg, he had already set this poem to music before his departure from Germany in November 1882, as evidenced by a sheet of music signed and dated by Gelbke. Disc recordings of this song were already released around 1910 by many German manufacturers.

=== Lied Heimkehr bzw. 'Horch, die alten Eichen rauschen' ===
Listen to this Lied:
Text: (Orthography and typesetting according to original by Emil Schimpke in)

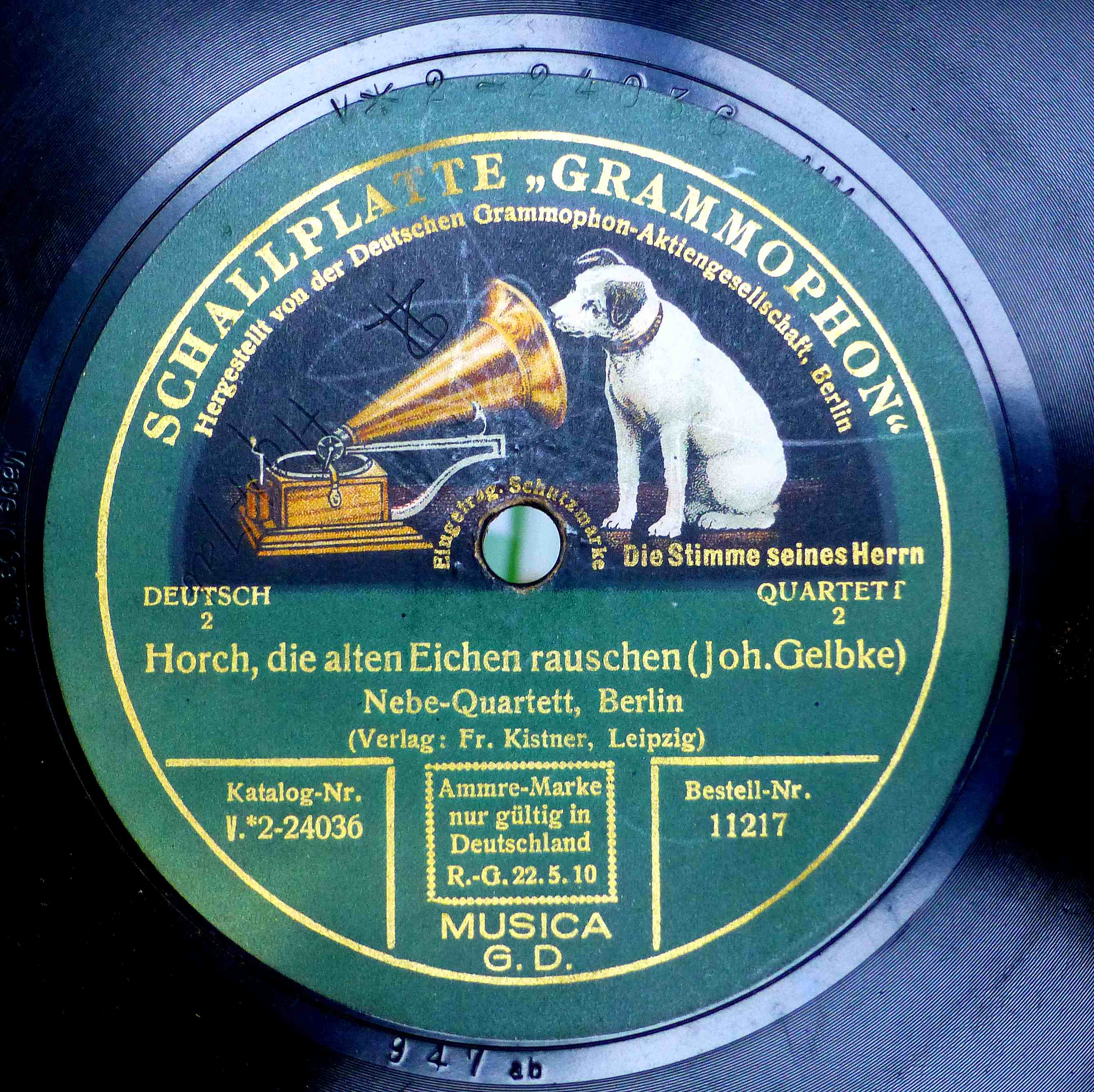
Label der Schellackplatte "Horch, die alten Eichen rauschen", ca. 1910

Horch! Die alten Eichen rauschen
Immer noch dasselbe Lied;
Sonst ist alles anders worden,
seit ich aus der Heimat schied.

Mit Geleit zog ich von hinnen,
Fremd und einsam zieh ich her,
Herz, wie bist du voll von Sehnen!
Heimat, ach, wie bist du leer!

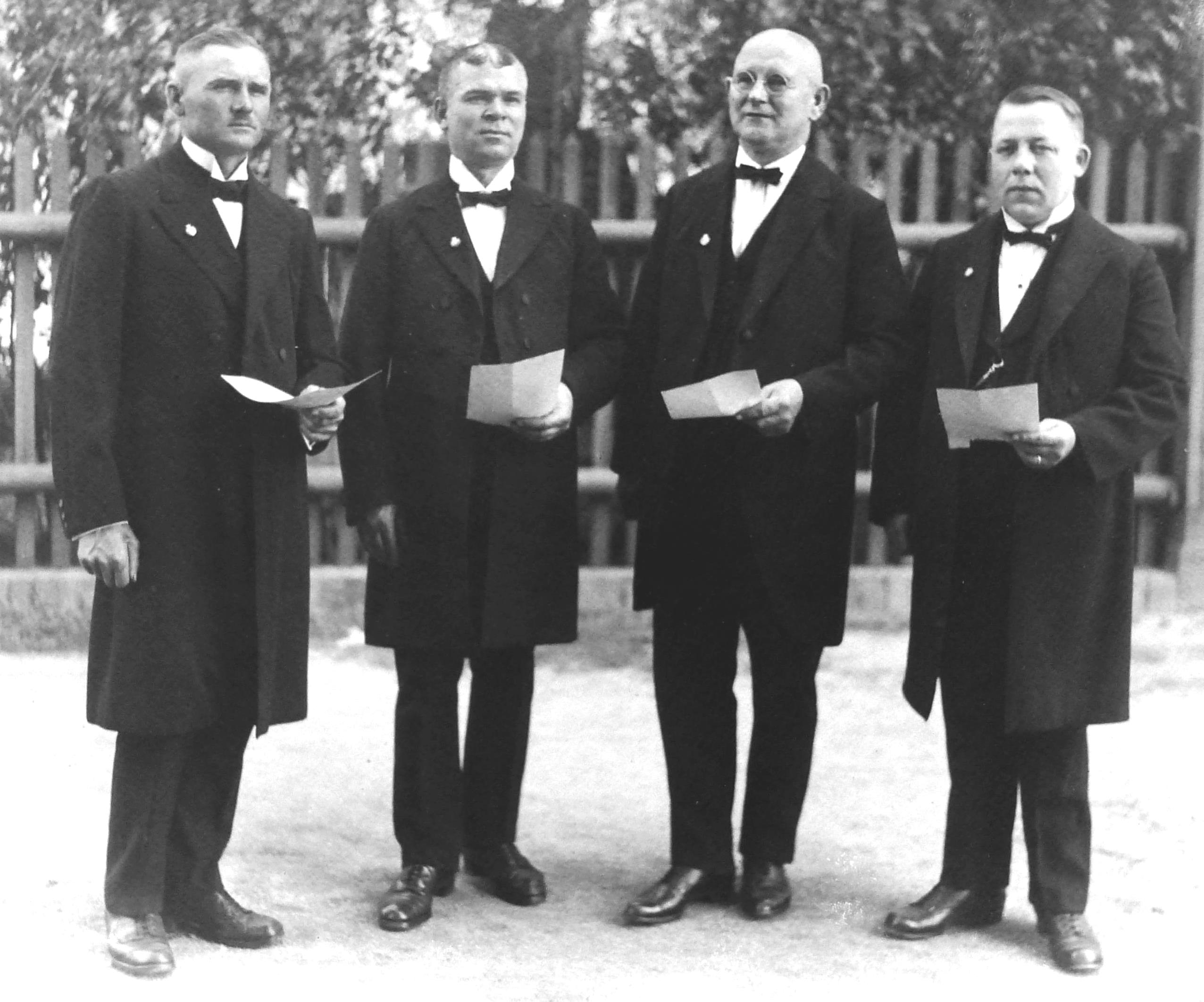
Quartett des „MGV Sächsische Glasfabrik“ Radeberg 1928, „Heimkehr“ war beliebtestes Stück; v. l. n. r.: Arthur Müller, Oskar Bitter, August Kuschke, Rudolf Krause

Nur die alten Kirchenglocken
Singen ihren frommen Sang,
Sonst hat Willkomm' mir geboten
Keiner lieben Stimme Klang,

Und kein glänzend Auge wünschte
Freundlich mir zur Heimkehr Glück.
Herz! Die Heimat ward zur Fremde,
Warum kehrtest du zurück?

Nur der Wald hat dir erhalten
Hinterm beerenreichen Haag
Wohlbekanntes Grünen, Blühen
Und den alten Finkenschlag;

Leises Flüstern, Jugendträume,
Heimisch Wehen, Herzensfried';
Und die alten Eichen rauschen
Immer noch dasselbe Lied!

=== Other works ===
after

- Dornröschen, Dramatische Kleinigkeit, after texts by Hermann Unbescheid
- 11 Vertonungen für Männerchöre (mit Bearbeitungen für Singstimmen und Piano), darunter neben „Heimkehr“ weitere 6 Gedichte von Emil Schimpke:
  - Auf hohem Berg Op. 6 Nr. 1
  - Scheidelied Op. 6 Nr. 2
  - Elfenreigen Op. 13
  - Sternennacht Op. 15
  - Heimkehr Op. 16 Nr. 1
  - Morgenlied Op. 20
  - Nachtgedanken, ohne Nr
- Gruss an die Nacht Op. 7, text by H. Waldow
- Heldenfeier Op. 16 Nr. 1, text by Julius Sturm
- Ade Op. 18 Nr. 1, text by P. Schönfeld
- Fahnenlied Op. 18 Nr. 2 text by Scholl
- Jubilate Amen Op. 8, Hymn for soprano solo, male choir and orchestra with the text by the Irish national poet Thomas Moore, among others already set to music by Max Bruch (Opus 3) in 1856.
- the 100th Psalm "Jauchzet dem Herrn" Op. 17 for mixed choir, winds, timpani / organ
- Wedding Song for mixed choir Op. 12 after words from the Bible, Ruth I
- div. LIeder for 4 and 5 male voices, soli and choir, Op. 9 - 11 and 19, after texts among others by Joseph von Eichendorff.

No specific information is available about his numerous compositions from 1882 onwards in Buffalo.

== Acknowledgements ==
=== Sächsischer Elbgau-Sänger-Bund ===
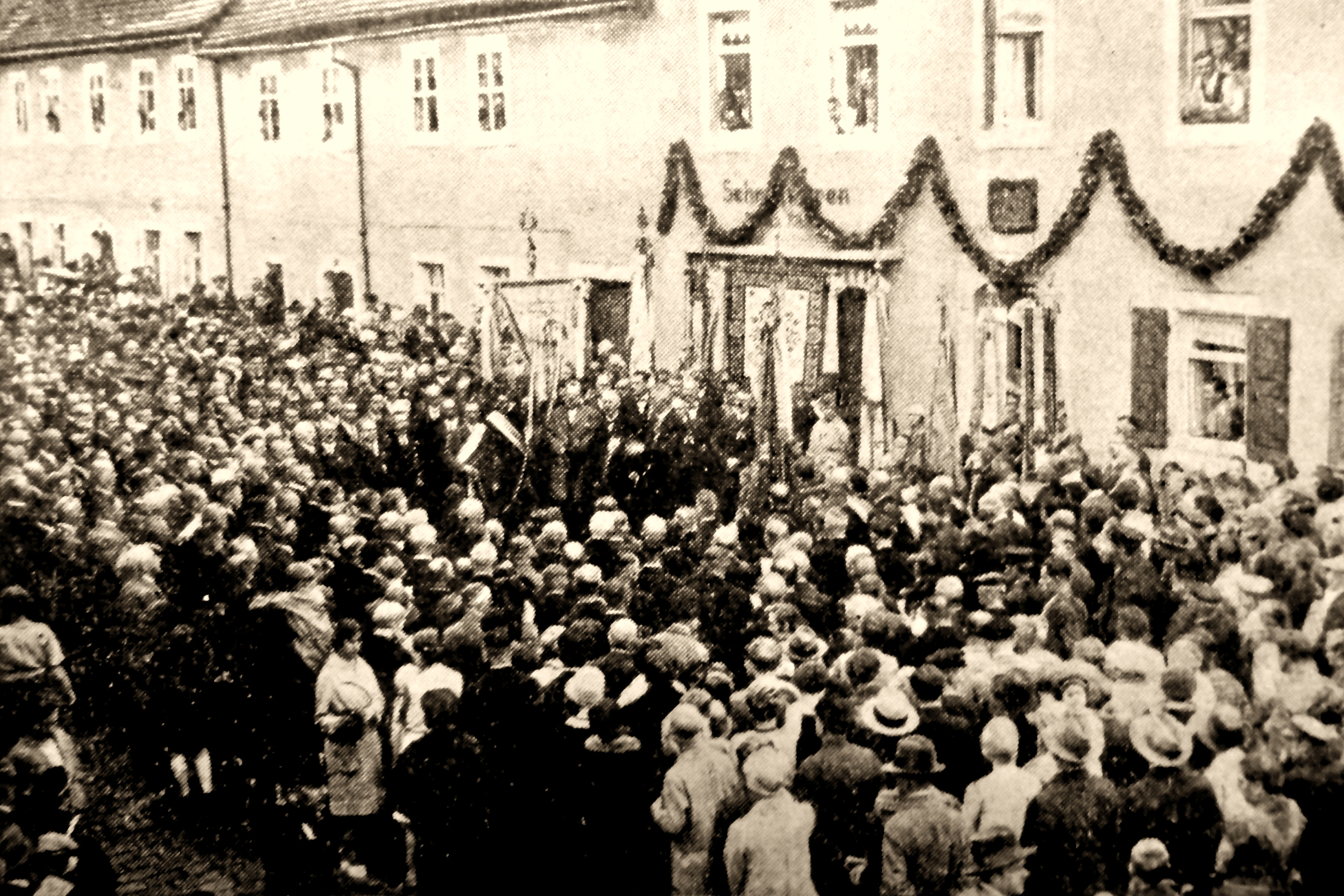
Dedication of the memorial plaque on Gelbke's birthplace in Radeberg on 7 September 1930

On the occasion of the 40th anniversary of the "Radeberg Group" in the Sächsischer Elbgau-Sänger-Bund, a bronze commemorative plaque was dedicated at his birthplace in Radeberg on 7 September 1930, which is still there today.

=== Gelbkehain ===
On the occasion of the 100th anniversary of his birth, a park in his honour was renamed Gelbkehain in his native town of Radeberg on 19 July 1946. The park is located in the city centre, directly on the course of the Große Röder. A memorial stone, also erected in 1946, commemorates Gelbke here..
