= La marquise de Brinvilliers (opera) =

1831 opera by nine French and Italian composers

- Opera by nine composers
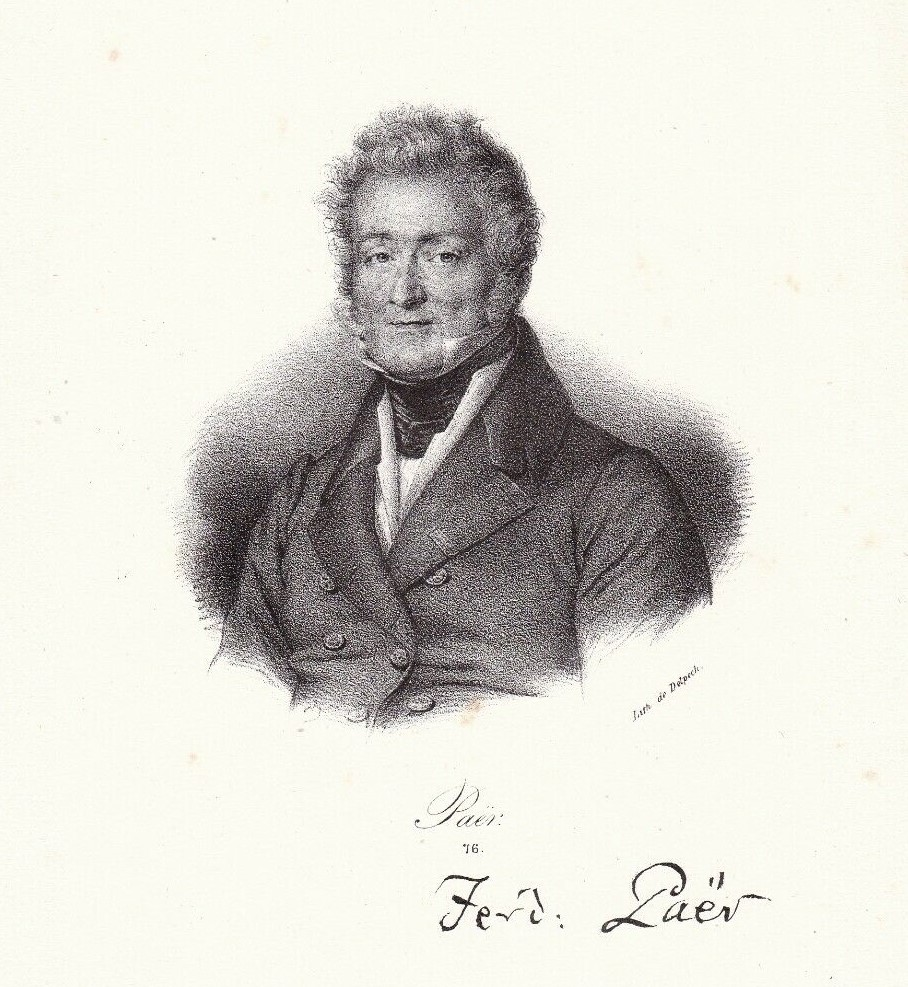
- Ferdinando Paer, one of the composers
- Librettist: Eugène Scribe; Castil-Blaze
- Language: French
- Premiere: 18 October 1831; Salle Ventadour, Paris

La marquise de Brinvilliers is an operatic 'drame lyrique' that was written as a collaborative effort on the part of nine composers. It premiered in Paris at the Salle Ventadour of the Opéra-Comique on 31 October 1831.

== Composition and performances ==
Under the Empire and Restoration, there were a number of collaborations in which composers worked together in a very short time to produce works to celebrate events of importance to the ruling dynasty, such as a marriage, birth, or baptism. Such a composition was usually the work of a few days and might involve as many as 4 composers. The only notable work by many hands before the composition of La marquise de Brinvilliers was Le congrès des rois, conceived in a revolutionary spirit, the work of 12 composers, and presented at the Opéra-Comique on 26 February 1794.

In 1831, the Opéra-Comique was suffering financially and its Salle Ventadour was no longer fashionable. Émile Lubbert, the director of company, needed to mount a successful production promptly. He engaged Eugène Scribe and Castil-Blaze to produce a libretto and, with no time to spare, divided the work of composition among nine composers: Daniel Auber, Désiré-Alexandre Batton, Henri Montan Berton, Giuseppe Marco Maria Felice Blangini, François-Adrien Boieldieu, Michele Carafa, Luigi Cherubini, Ferdinand Hérold, and Ferdinando Paer. A review in the Courrier de l'Europe noted the inclusion of a gigue by Gossec, a composer of an older generation who died in 1829.

The work premiered on 31 October 1831 and had a very modest run of 32 performances, the last on 9 December, at which point the theater closed. The theater re-opened in January 1832 under a new director and continued to struggle. Before the end of 1831, F. Marcucci composed a "Fantasy for harp on the prettiest motifs from la Marquise de Brinvilliers". The opera was revived in 1836 and presented for 11 performances. No further performances have been documented.

== Roles ==
Role	Voice type	Premiere Cast, 31 October 1831 (Conductor: Valentino)
La marquise de Brinvilliers		Prévost, likely soprano Geneviève-Aimé-Zoë Prévost
Hortense De Montmélian, wife of Vernillac	soprano	Félicité Pradher
Arthur de Saint-Brice, a young man in love with Hortense		Moreau Sainti
M. de Vermilhac (also Vernillac), fermier-général du royaume		Boulard
Galifard, an Italian in the employ of la marquise	baritone	Louis Féréol
Madelon, "soeur de lait d'Hortense" (i.e., her friend since birth)		Boulanger
Le premier du Roi		Louvet
Valet to Vermilhac/Vernillac		Charles
Male servant of la marquise		Duchenet
M. de Coulange		Alfred
Guests and friends

== Synopsis ==
The action of the opera is based loosely on the story of Marie-Madeleine-Marguerite d'Aubray, Marquise de Brinvilliers, an historical figure of the seventeenth century whose trial for murder initiated the Affair of the Poisons, which saw a number of French aristocrats accused of murder and witchcraft.

The first two acts take place at the home of M. de Vernillac at Versailles. The third act is set in Paris at the hotel of the marquise on the rue Neuve-Saint-Paul.

Time: during the reign of Louis XIV, 1643–1715.

Before the action of the opera begins, Hortense De Montmélian and Arthur Saint-Brice, both without fortunes, love one another, but the Marquise has contrived to separate them and make each believe the other has cut off contact. She has arranged for Hortense to marry Vernillac, a wealthy government official.

=== Act 1 ===
As guests arrive for the wedding of Vernillac and Hortense, he rejoices while the future bride expresses her dismay and discusses with her friend Madelon how Arthur's silence has hurt her. The Marquise meets privately with her retainer Galifard and learns he knows more than she imagined of her passion for Arthur and her manipulation of the young lovers. Arthur enters and explains he has come to the Marquise for counsel. Despite a year's separation he needs to see the woman he loves just once more. The Marquise orders him to leave, but he encounters Madelon, who quickly learns that he is as wounded as Hortense and never saw her many letters. As he rushes to stop the wedding, the married couple returns and, amid general rejoicing, Hortense and Arthur recognize one another.

=== Act 2 ===
Hortense and Arthur meet and reconcile. The Marquise interrupts them and, hiding her love for Arthur and her hatred of her rival, persuades them to separate lest Vernillac become even more suspicious than he already is. Arthur writes a letter to Hortense and Madelon plans to get it past Vernillac by placing it in a basket under a bouquet of roses meant for Hortense. The Marquise has learned of the letter and added to it a subtle and quick-acting poison that will allow her to rid herself of her rival. Hortense and Vernillac, already a jealous husband, prepare to leave the wedding ball. He hears Madelon whispering to Hortense and catches the phrase "in the basket." When they are finally alone, he questions her with increasing vehemence about any secrets she may be withholding from him. At first she protests her devotion, but can not disguise her feelings and eventually admits there is a letter hidden with the flowers. He snatches the bouquet from the basket, inhales its perfume, and falls dead. Hortense cries out for help and the wedding guests enter and express general astonishment.

=== Act 3 ===
Alone, the Marquise reviews the letters Galifard has returned to her of his own accord. She doubts he could have blackmailed her without implicating himself, but she burns them all. In the bottom of his portfolio she finds a secret compartment containing a powder-filled red packet that she determines is his secret antidote that has protected him from her attempt to poison him. She replaces the antidote with a slow-acting poison. Galifard arrives and speaks of their marriage. She is shocked, but pretends to humor him. When tea arrives, she adds sugar to hers while he adds powder from his red packet saying it is medicinal. They discuss their anticipated trip to Italy and future happiness. As he leaves she rejoices that he will be dead within the hour.

The scene changes. Hortense appears in mourning for Vernillac. Arthur begs the Marquise to ask Hortense to see him. The Marquise instead insinuates to Hortense that Arthur poisoned Vernillac. Hortense imagines Arthur will flee France to avoid arrest. She is overcome, newly widowed and now about to lose Arthur. When Arthur approaches Hortense, she refuses to speak to him saying she is prepared to enter the convent. Arthur starts to leave in anger as the Marquise relishes her triumph in separating the lovers. Suddenly Galifard enters, a specter, shriveling and in convulsions. With his last breath he accuses the Marquise of poisoning Vernillac and dies. All becomes instantly clear. Galifard dies. As the Marquise is led away to stand trial, she gazes at him in triumph and vengeance.

== Assessments ==
A lengthy review in the Courrier d'Europe called it "the most interesting work the Ventadour has offered in a long time." The Revue des deux mondes thought the music was "diffuse and without unity" but noted that "a duet by Auber in the third act received much applause. The tragedy is well constructed and affecting. There is lots of poison but it is handled plausibly; unfortunately a duet does not make an opera, not even a comic opera." Frédéric Chopin, on the other hand, wrote that it would have been difficult to assemble a better group for such a joint effort: "I confess I was not bored and that it was not a work to mock."

According to a later assessment of the Paris musical scene at the time of the opera's premiere, Cherubini was the old master of the group, "the Nestor of composers." Batton was the least noted, who wrote a few unsuccessful operas and then worked in the manufacture of artificial flowers. Berton, Paer, Blangini, Carafa were past the height of their careers. Boieldieu had successes in the 1820s as well as one noteworthy failure. Herold's Zampa had just premiered to great acclaim. Auber was at the height of his fame and powers.

== Contributions ==
- Daniel Auber
  - Duet in the third act, "a masterpiece of theatrical insight"
- Désiré-Alexandre Batton
  - Duet and finale in the first act.
- Henri Montan Berton
  - Couplets in the third act.
- Giuseppe Marco Maria Felice Blangini
  - No. 3, Recitative and Aria: "Oui mon repos l'exige"
  - No. 5, Rondo: "De ces lieux que j'abhorre"
  - No. 6, Duet: "Un mot encore, un mot, Madam"
- François-Adrien Boieldieu
  - Couplets
- Michele Carafa
  - Overture, 2nd act finale
  - 2nd act duet
- Luigi Cherubini
  - Introduction to the first act (lost)
- Ferdinand Hérold
  - Finale to the third act
- Ferdinando Paer
  - Air à l'italienne

== See also ==
- List of operas by Ferdinando Paer

== Sources ==
- Sadie, Stanley, ed. (1992). The New Grove Dictionary of Opera (4 volumes). London: Macmillan. ISBN 978-1-56159-228-9.
- Scribe, Eugène. "La marquise de Brinvilliers", in Théàtre complet de M. Eugène Scribe, 2nd edition, vol. 20 (Paris: Aimé André, 1837), 187–267. Google Books: "La marquise de Brinvilliers". Also available as Eugène Scribe, "La marquise de Brinvilliers", in Œuvres complètes de M. Eugène Scribe, vol. 2 (Paris: Furne et Cie. and Aimé André, 1841), 428–50. Google Books: "La marquise de Brinvilliers".
- Wild, Nicole; Charlton, David (2005). Théâtre de l'Opéra-Comique Paris: répertoire 1762–1972. Sprimont, Belgium: Editions Mardaga. ISBN 978-2-87009-898-1.
