= Le maître de chapelle =

- Opéra comique by Ferdinando Paer
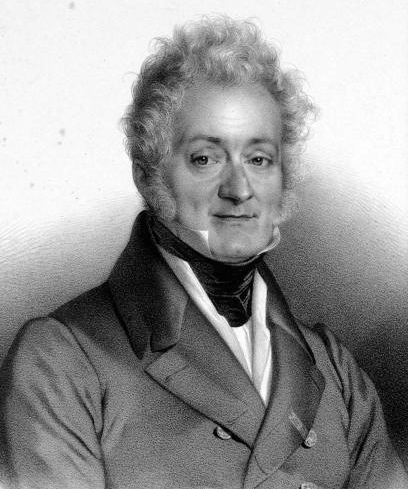
- Ferdinando Paer, Lithograph by François Delpech
- Translation: The Chapelmaster
- Librettist: Sophie Gay
- Language: French
- Based on: Alexandre Duval's Le souper imprévu, ou Le chanoine de Milan
- Premiere: 29 March 1821; Théâtre Feydeau, Paris

Le maître de chapelle, ou Le souper imprévu (The Chapelmaster, or The Unexpected Supper) is an opéra comique in two acts by the Italian composer Ferdinando Paer. The French libretto, by Sophie Gay, is based on Le souper imprévu, ou Le chanoine de Milan by Alexandre Duval (1796).

Le maître de chapelle was premiered by the Opéra-Comique at the Théâtre Feydeau in Paris on 29 March 1821 with the famous baritone Jean-Blaise Martin as Barnabé. By 1900 the work had been performed by the Opéra-Comique over 430 times. It was given at the Royal Opera in London on 13 June 1845, and at the Théâtre d'Orléans, New Orleans on 21 November 1848.

It became Paer's most popular work, albeit usually performed in an abridged version of only the first act.

== Roles ==
Cast	Voice type	Premiere cast, 29 March 1821
Barnabé	baritone	Jean-Blaise Martin
Gertrude, Barnabé's French chef	soprano	Marie-Julie Halligner ('Mme Boulanger')
Benetto, Barnabé's nephew	tenor	Louis Féréol
Coelénie, Barnabé's pupil	soprano	Antoinette-Eugénie Rigaut
Firmin, Captain of Hussars	tenor	
Sans Quartier, a hussar	bass	

== Synopsis ==
1797, near Milan. The chapelmaster Barnabé has composed an opera entitled Cléopâtre which he hopes will be staged in Milan, however he is worried that someone in the invading French army will take it away from him.

== Recordings ==
Paer: Le maître de chapelle - ORTF Chamber Orchestra

- Conductor: Jean-Paul Kreder
- Principal singers: Jean-Christophe Benoît (Barnabé), Mady Mesplé (Coelénie), Isabel Garcisanz (Gertrude), Michel Sénéchal (Benetto), Pierre Pégaud (Firmin), Yves Bisson (Sans Quartier)
- Recording date: 1970
- Label: Black Disc - Inedits ORTF - 995 004 (LP)

== See also ==
- List of operas by Ferdinando Paer

== Sources ==
- Casaglia, Gherardo (2005)."Le maître de chapelle, 29 March 1821". L'Almanacco di Gherardo Casaglia (in Italian).
- Balthazar, Scott L (1992), 'Maître de chapelle, Le' in The New Grove Dictionary of Opera, ed. Stanley Sadie (London) ISBN 0-333-73432-7
- Warrack, John and West, Ewan (1992), The Oxford Dictionary of Opera, 782 pages, ISBN 0-19-869164-5
