= I fuorusciti di Firenze =

Opera by Ferdinando Paer

- Opera by Ferdinando Paer
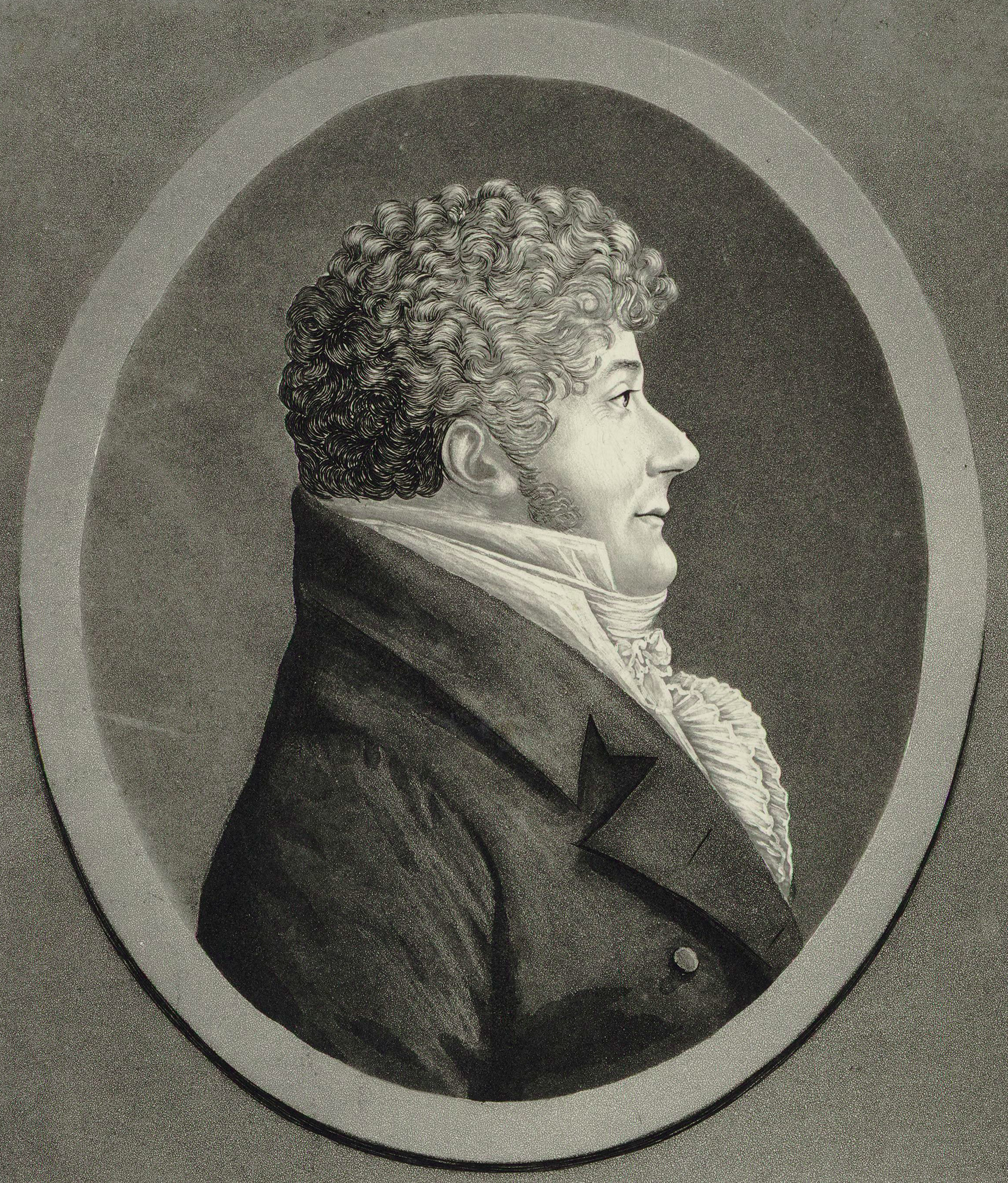
- Ferdinando Paer, engraving by Edme Quenedey des Ricets, 1809
- Translation: The Exiles of Florence
- Librettist: Angelo Anelli
- Language: Italian
- Premiere: 27 November 1802; Hoftheater, Dresden

I fuorusciti di Firenze (The Exiles of Florence) is an opera semiseria in two acts by the Italian composer Ferdinando Paer. The libretto was by Angelo Anelli. The work is a form of 'rescue opera'.

The opera was first performed at the Hoftheater in Dresden on 27 November 1802.

== Roles ==
Roles, voice types
Cast	Voice type
Isabella, Princess of Florence	soprano
Umberto degli Ardinghelli, a bandit	bass-baritone
Edoardo de Liggozzi, Isabella's husband	tenor
Gianni, Edoardo's servant	bass
Cecchina, a peasant girl	soprano
Lena, a peasant girl	soprano

== Synopsis ==
The bandit Umberto holds Isabella prisoner, and her husband Edoardo attempts unsuccessfully to rescue her. Eventually Isabella is revealed as Umberto's daughter.

== See also ==
- List of operas by Ferdinando Paer
