= Morettisches Opernhaus =

German opera house

Coordinates: 51.054344°N 13.736601°E

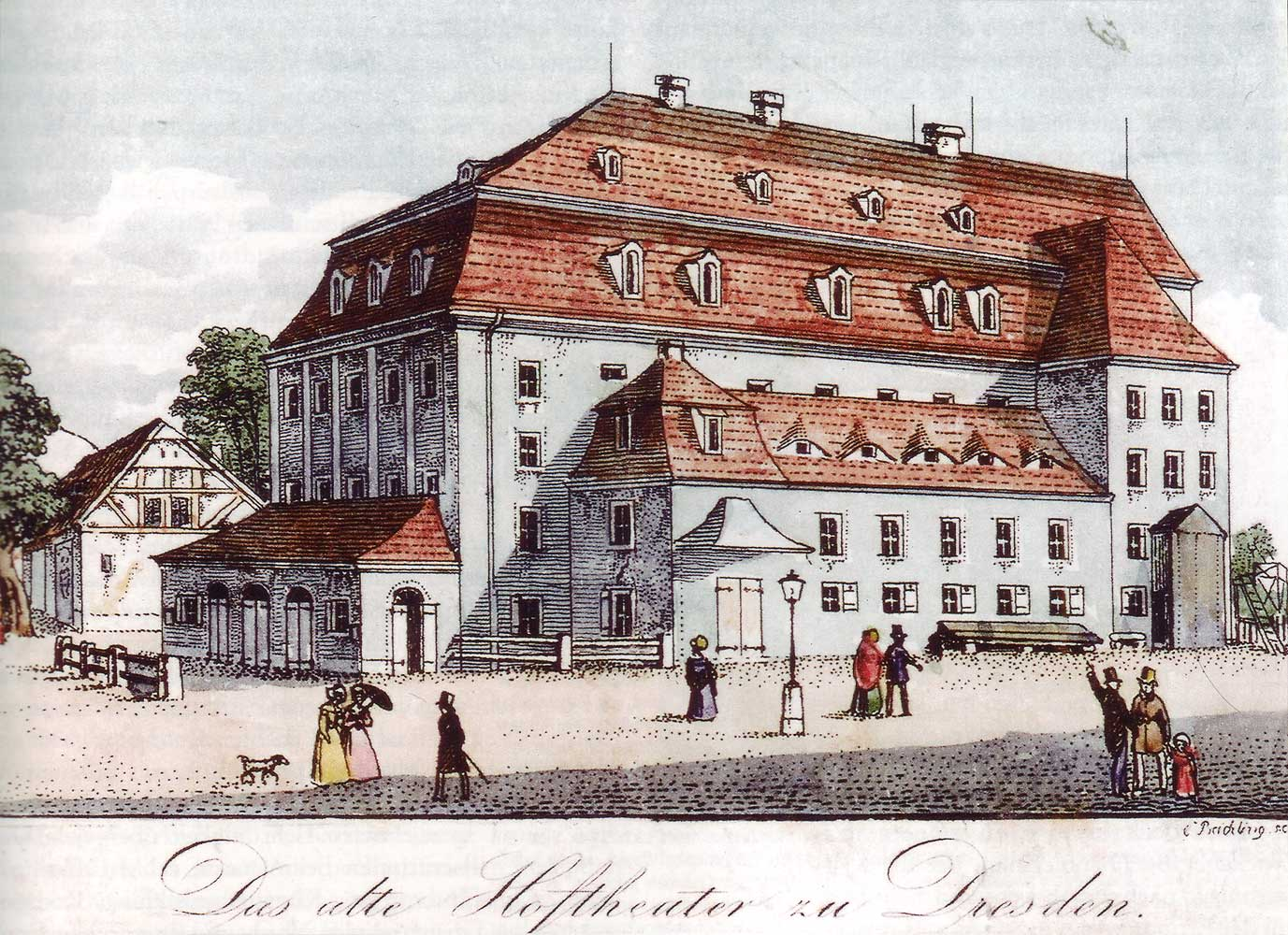
Morettisches Opernhaus, ca. 1820

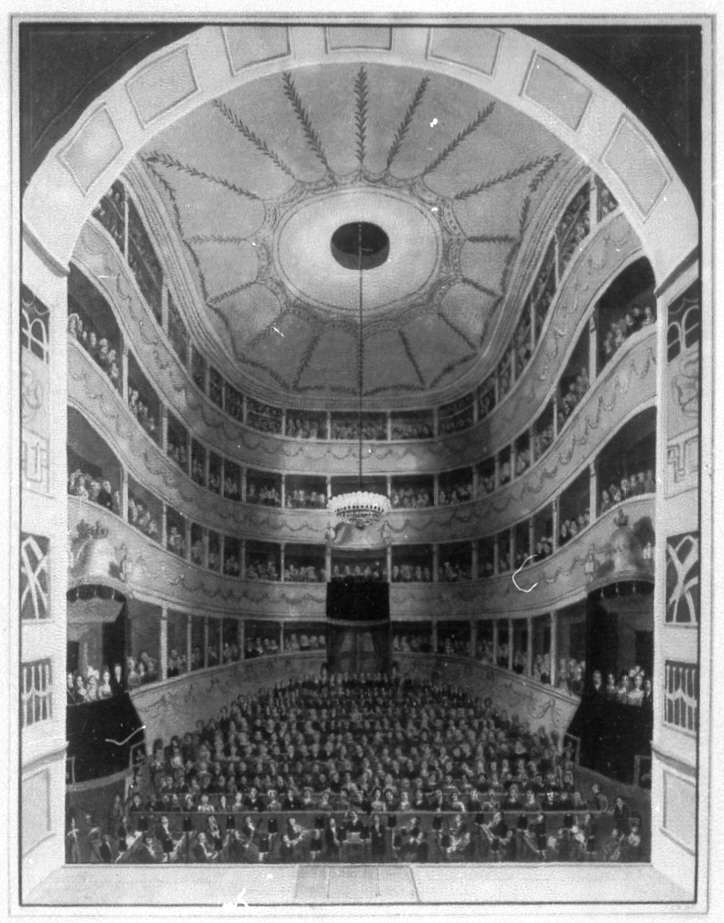
Inner view, 1841

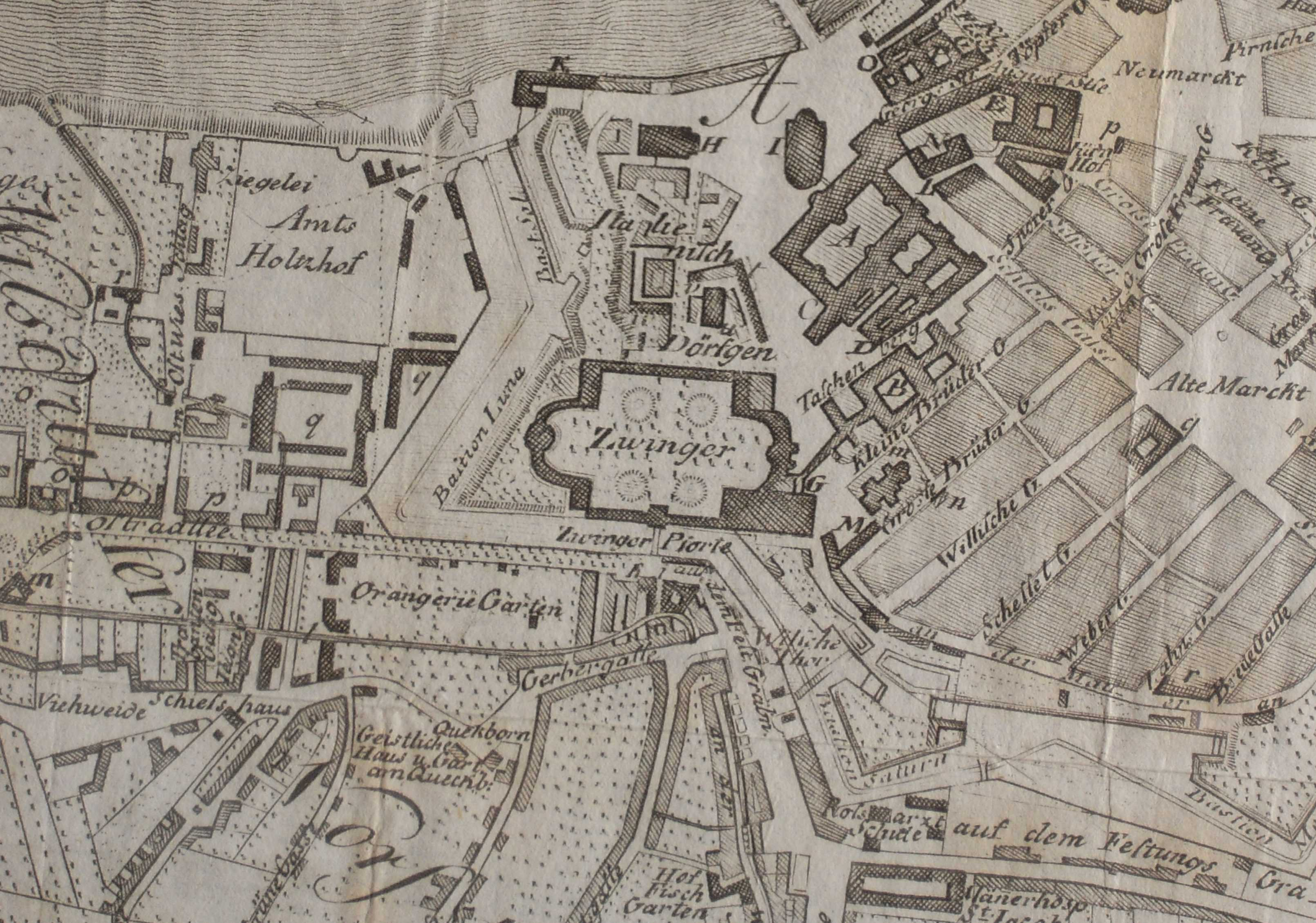
Map of Dresden city centre c. 1809, with "H" the small court theatre at the Italian village is marked, with "G" the court theatre at the Zwinger

The Morettische Opernhaus (also Moretti-Theater) was the most frequently performed opera house in Dresden from the end of the 18th century, in the era of Carl Maria von Weber and until the construction of the first Königliches Hoftheater Dresden.

== History ==
From 1664 to 1667 a first opera house had been built in Dresden near the castle (Opernhaus am Taschenberg near the Zwingers). In 1719 the Opernhaus am Zwinger followed. In the middle of the 18th century, the impresario Pietro Moretti, who was a guest in Dresden, was granted the privilege of building a "standing theatre" here. This was then built in 1754/55, initially by Julius Heinrich Schwarze and court room, mechanical engineering and theatre builder Christian Gottlieb Reuß, of half-timbering and wood on the site of the Italienisches Dörfchen (where the north-east side of the Theaterplatz at the Semper Opera is today). In 1761, after Moretti had made an interim guest appearance in Margravial Opera House in Bayreuth, it was rebuilt in stone.

In 1780, it was designated a court theatre, but only as the small court theatre, as the existing theatre at the Zwinger was significantly larger.

The Moretti Theatre had a floor plan of about 40×17 metres and had three tiers with initially 350 seats; in 1783 it was expanded to accommodate an audience of about 800.

The troupes of Joseph Seconda, Johann Gottlieb Naumann and later also Ferdinando Paër, Francesco Morlacchi and finally Weber and Carl Gottlieb Reissiger worked in this theatre and the one on the Lincke’sches Bad. In 1829, the violin virtuoso Paganini made a guest appearance at the Moretti Opera House.

After the new Königliches Hoftheater Dresden was opened on 13 April 1841, after only three years of construction, Weber's Jubel-Ouvertüre and Goethe's play Torquato Tasso had been inaugurated, the Morettisches Opernhaus was demolished.

== Premiere ==
- Francesco Morlacchi: Il barbiere di Siviglia, April 1816.

== Hofkapellmeister ==
Important composers worked as conductors at the Dresden Court Opera of that time:

- Johann Gottlieb Naumann (1741–1801)
- Ferdinando Paër (1771–1839, 1802–1806)
- Francesco Morlacchi (1784–1841, italienisches Operndepartement 1811–1841)
- Carl Maria von Weber (1786–1826, deutsches Operndepartement 1817–1826)
- Carl Gottlieb Reissiger (1798–1859, 1826–1859)

== Singers ==
- Friederike Funk
- Wilhelmine Schröder-Devrient
