= Joseph Seconda =

German theatre director

Johann Christian Joseph Seconda (17 May 1761 – 14 June 1820) was a German actor and director of a travelling opera company.

== Life ==
Born in Dresden, Seconda was the younger brother of Franz Seconda. He was the son of delicatessen owner Francesco Maria Seconda (1725–1773), an Italian, and his wife Sophia Dorothea, née Krampe (1729–1809).

Little is known about Secona's childhood. At the age of 24, he debuted, possibly briefly, at the Hamburg theatre in summer 1785, under Johann Christian Brandes and possibly in autumn with Catharina Opitz at the Deutsch-Sorbisches Volkstheater.

in 1786, he took over a part of the Dresden court theater from previous owner Pasquale Bondini. He directed there as a headmaster until 1817. This theater company, called Deutsche Operngesellschaft, also Deutsche Schauspieler-Ge September sellschaft, played mainly in both Leipzig (1788–1796, 1800–1806, 1810–1817) and Dresden (1787, 1790–1807, 1809–1816). Beginning in 1788, he worked closely with his brother Franz Seconda, who, after Bondini, took over the Dresden court theater. Both benefitted from Bondini's reputation, with him being allowed to play in Leipzig during the War of the Bavarian Succession as a compensation for performances in Dresden. During the performances in Leipzig from 1807 to 1809, which were cancelled due to the war, there was a new cooperation with the Bautzen theater, which was under Friedrich Nitzschke.

The company's repertoire consisted almost exclusively of operas, such as works by Luigi Cherubini, Ferdinando Paër and Mozart, such as Don Giovanni, Le nozze di Figaro and The Abduction from the Seraglio. It also featured The interrupted sacrificial feast and Weber's Silvana as well as The Uncle from Amsterdam by Cimarosa. A comic opera in two acts, it was adapted from the Italian: il pittore parigino, being arranged and set to Cimarosa's original music. It was performed by the Seconda'schen Gesellschaft in Leipzig and Dresden, as well as Riga and Mitau 1796, with Wilhelm Christian Andreas Müller.

The Deutsche Operngesellschaft was only allowed to perform in Dresden in the small theater outside the Schwarzen Thors at the Lincke’sches Bad. In the conflict between German and Italian opera, no musician of the Staatskapelle Dresden or the Semperoper under Francesco Morlacchi was allowed to perform with Seconda. These restrictions meant that the German opera did not achieve its breakthrough in Dresden until Carl Maria von Weber from 1817.

In February 1813, E. T. A. Hoffmann was offered the position of music director of Seconda's troupe, commuting between Leipzig and Dresden. Hoffmann had already applied for this position in 1810, when the society had been reorganized. In mid-March 1813, Seconda confirmed the contract with Hoffmann, who traveled to Dresden. At that time, however, the city was occupied by French troops and was at the center of the War of the Bavarian Succession against Napoleon. Seconda therefore stayed in Leipzig and called Hoffmann to his home. When an armistice was declared until mid-August 1813, Seconda was finally granted a playing permit for Dresden. However, the usual venue, the Theater am Lincke'schen Bad, was located outside the entrenchments around Dresden and was reserved for performances of the Théâtre Français under French occupation. Through the mediation of his brother Franz, Joseph was therefore granted permission to play at the Dresden court theater. There, the opera company alternated between Italians and French works. In the winter of 1813/14, he again organised opera performances in Leipzig. When there were increasing differences with Hoffmann, Seconda dismissed him in February 1814. In his dramatic fragment of "Blandina", Hoffmann is said to have created a portrait of Seconda.

After the wars of liberation, Seconda resumed regular playing between Dresden and Leipzig. Hoffmann was replaced in 1814 by Carl Friedrich Ebers as bandmaster. In 1816, Friedrich Christian Hermann Uber took over this position.

When Seconda's company was dissolved in 1817, it formed the personnel basis of the Leipziger Stadttheater under director Karl Theodor von Küstner, although Seconda was still working at the theater. From 1817 to 1820, Seconda lived in Leipzig in the Am Mühlgraben house No. 1057.

Seconda died in Leipzig at the age of 59.

== Family ==
Seconda was married three times; The first marriage from 1782 with Benedicta Elisabeth Jenik (1745–1791), after her death in 1792, she married Sophia Louise Isabella Charlotte Cordemann (1771–1795) and after her death from 1800, she married Juliane Friederike Fuhrmann. The last marriage saw birth of two daughters, who later on worked as actresses, also in the company of their father; Caroline Antonie Friederike ("Antonie", baptized on May 26, 1802, in Dresden, married on April 24, 1822, to the actor Georg Heinrich Metzner, died on June 28, 1888, in Dresden) and Sophie Dorothea Ernestina ("Sophie", baptized on October 13, 1803, in Dresden, died after 1827).
