= Lincke'sches Bad =

Garden, theatre and restaurant in Dresden

Coordinates: 51.06311°N 13.763938°E

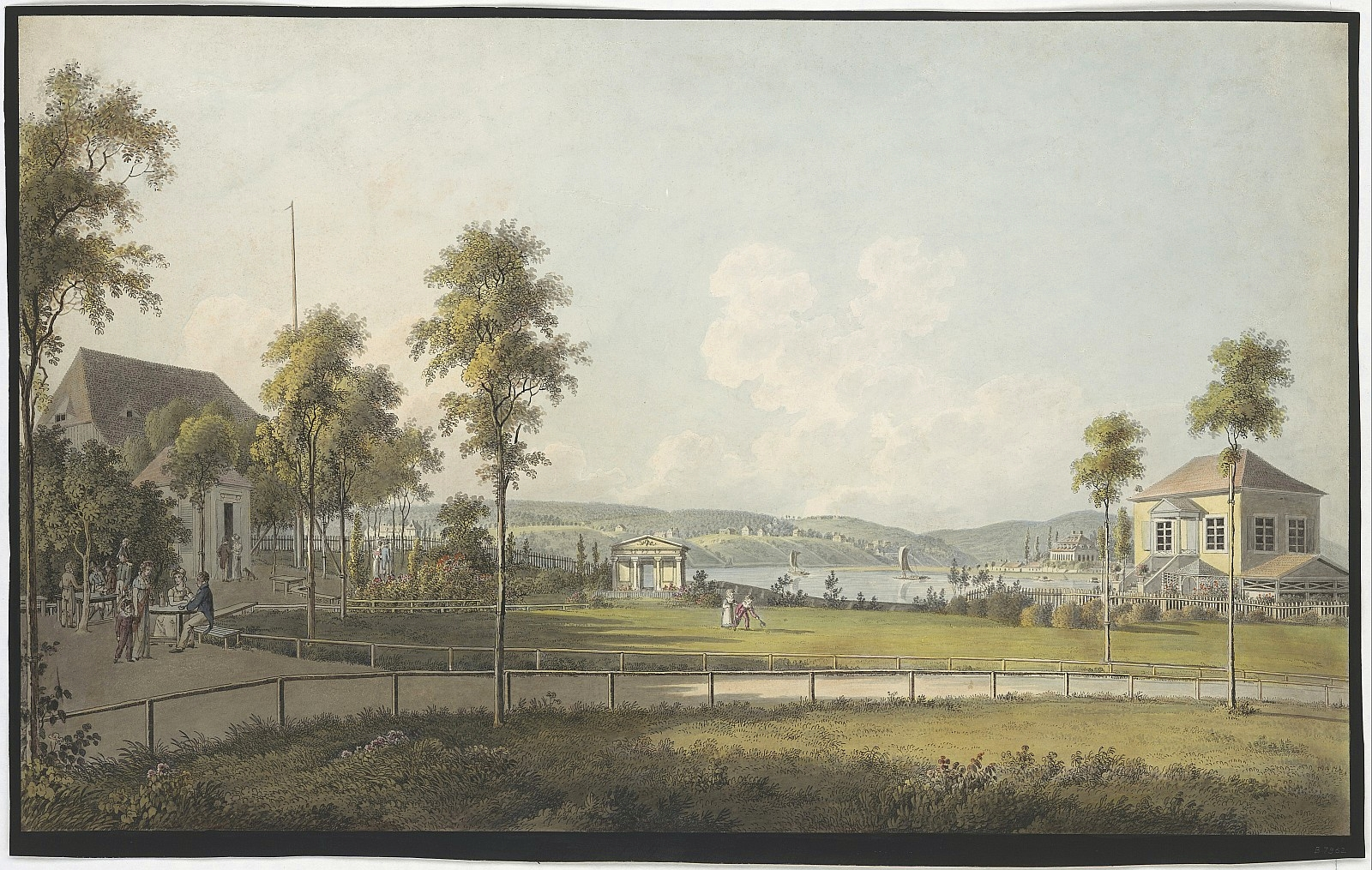
Lincke’sches Bad ca. 1825 with a view on the Elbe to Schlösschen Antons, engraving by Johann Friedrich Wizani

The Lincke'sche Bad was an excursion restaurant with a garden restaurant, summer theatre and concert hall in Dresden. At the same time, it was one of the first open-air baths.

The Dresden Court Theatre and famous artists such as Joseph Seconda, the composers Christian Gottlob Neefe and Carl Maria von Weber and the architect Bernhard Hempel worked there. Franz Grillparzer described the theatre during a visit in 1826 and E.T.A. Hoffmann used the location as the setting for his play The Golden Pot. In addition, the bath was a popular motif for postcards and engravings, for example by Ludwig Richter.

== Situation ==
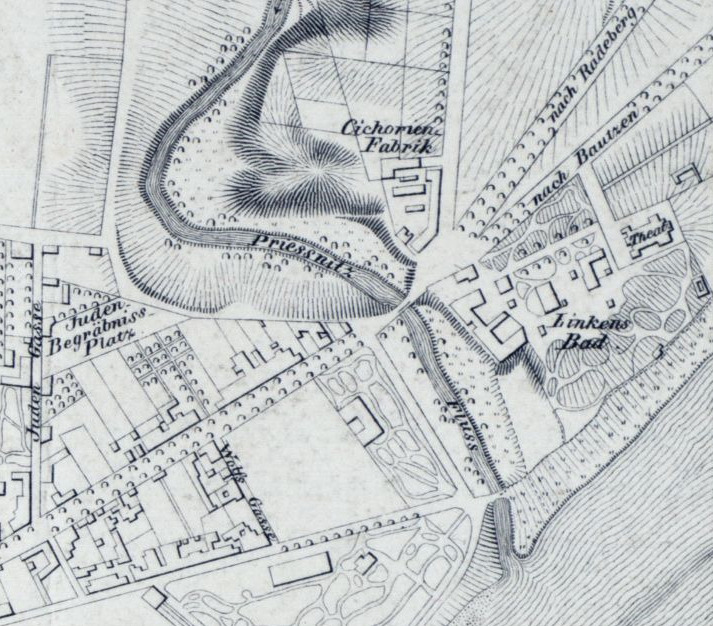
Lincke's bath in the city map of Dresden from 1828

The baths were built at the mouth of the Prießnitz behind the Schwarzes Tor and were connected to the Neustadt by an avenue, at that time with the address Schillerstraße 29. Today, the property is located approximately between the Diakonissenanstalt Dresden and Haus Bautzner Straße 82 in the Radeberger Vorstadt district. In the 1950s, pergolas and raised beds were created in the northwest corner from salvaged sandstone ashlars, and it was not until the mid-2010s that the grounds were provided with a sports field, a running track, a changing house and a car park.

== History ==
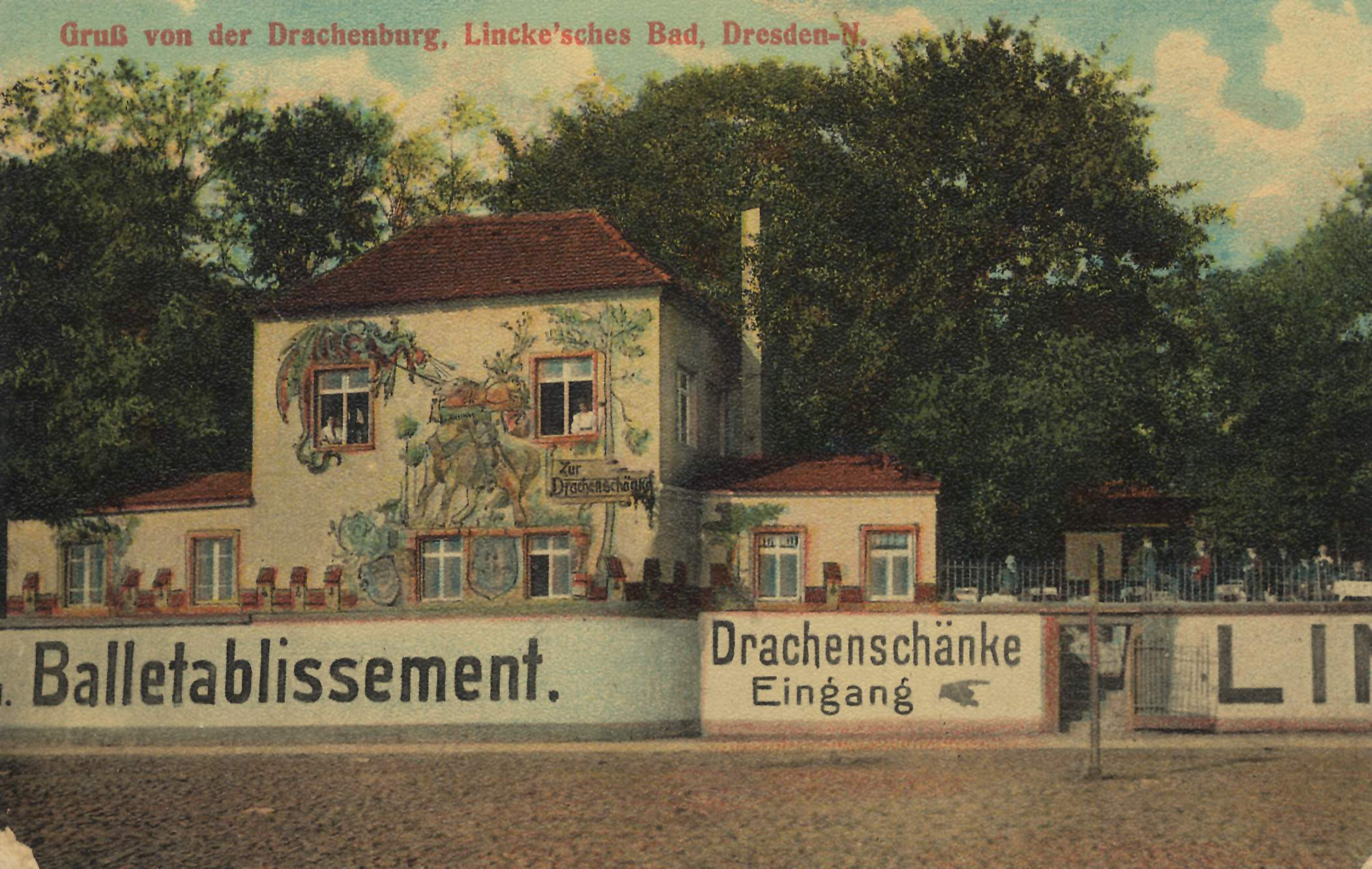
Drachenschänke, postcard 1914

In 1734, a Lusthäuschen was built behind the Black Gate directly on the Elbe, which in 1753 received a licence to serve beer and wine ("Drachenschänke") as well as to bake, slaughter and keep a forge. After the doctor Peter Ambrosius Lehmann received permission to set up a mineral bath, he had an open-air bath with bathhouse built there in 1763, which offered 28 tubs as well as summer quarters in 1824 and was operated until 1860. In 1764, Christian Gottlob Reuß built a garden restaurant there. In 1766, Carl Christian Lincke acquired the area and developed it into a place for excursions, building a summer theatre for travelling theatre companies on it in 1775/76, where, among others, the Seyler Theatre Company and the Secondasche Truppe moved in. Lincke was favoured by the 20-year tax exemption. In 1776, a new comedian house was created, which provided excellent conditions for the music theatres and singspiels, and later operas, that performed in the summer, thus filling the gap that the electoral theatres could not serve. From 1816–17 to 1858, the Royal Court Theatre or King Friedrich August I leased the "Theater auf dem Linckeschen Bade" as an additional venue, alongside the Morettisches Opernhaus, for the summer months. This was followed in 1853 by a large concert hall built by Bernhard Hempel, which, however, burned down in 1859. A year earlier, the theatre building was also demolished. In 1867, it reopened as the "Grand Théâtre des Varietés". By 1901, there was an elegant wine restaurant, a tunnel tavern, a hall, as well as a concert garden and numerous verandas, collectively known as the "Restaurationsgarten", which existed at least until the 1920s and is reported to have had 15,000 seats in 1911. During the Bombing of Dresden towards the end of the Second World War, the area was largely destroyed. Only the "Drachenschänke" remained, which was used as a restaurant until a few years ago, but now houses flats.

== Performances ==
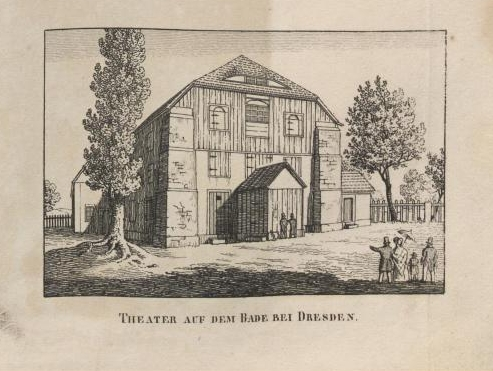
Theatre on the Bade near Dresden, copperplate engraving by 1837

The weekly performances of the Dresden Court Theatre in the Lincke'sches Bad and the garden concerts were famous and well attended. Announcements for these were made in the Dresdner Anzeiger as well as in the Dresdner Nachrichten. Numerous famous personalities took part in the performances, including the acting troupe around Joseph Seconda (engaged here between 1790 and 1816), the singers and actors of the Residenztheater, and Carl Maria von Weber and E.T.A. Hoffmann as conductors. On 30 April 1866, the eve of the inauguration of the new building of the Kreuzschule on Dresden's Georgplatz, the dramatic trifle: Sleeping Beauty was premiered in the hall of the baths, a play written by the Kreuzschüler Hermann Unbescheid (later Studienrat and Prof. Dr.) and set to music by Johannes Gelbke. On the evening of the consecration day, 1 May 1866, the performance was repeated in the presence of the King and the Saxon princes.

== Reception ==
Franz Grillparzer attended a concert in 1826 and noted: "Afternoon at the Linkesche Bade. Pretty place. Great concert for a penny deposit. Incidentally, less bad than the price suggested. The women are all knitting. The people look very good-natured but dull. Not a pretty one yet, hardly seen a few pretty girls. I think the Dresden girls are born at 30, so far I have seen almost no young ones." The bath also found its way into literature: in addition to numerous contemporary travel guides, E. T. A. Hoffmann also mentions the bath in one of his stories:

When the student had almost reached the end of the avenue leading to the Linkische Bade, he was about to run out of breath. He was forced to slow down, but he hardly dared to look up, for he could still see the apples and cakes dancing around him, and every friendly glance from this or that girl was only a reflection of the gleeful laughter at the Black Gate. So he had come to the entrance of the Linkish Baths; one line of festively dressed people after another moved in. Music from wind instruments sounded from inside, and the bustle of merry guests grew louder and louder. The tears almost came to the eyes of the poor student Anselmus, for he too, since Ascension Day had always been a special family celebration for him, had wanted to partake of the bliss of the Linkische Paradise, indeed he had wanted to go as far as half a portion of coffee with rum and a bottle of double beer, and in order to be able to slut around so much, he had taken more money than was actually permitted and feasible.

— E. T. A. Hoffmann, Der goldne Topf.

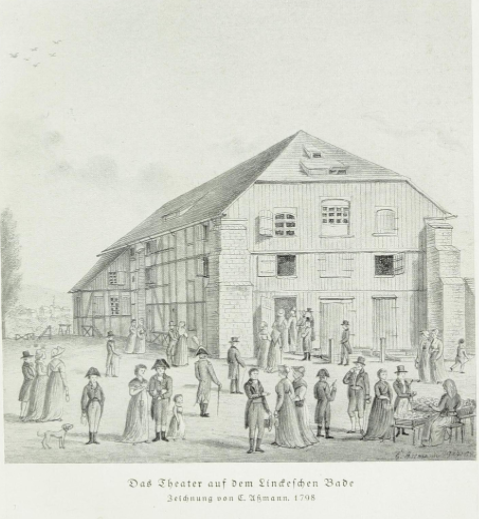
Theater auf dem Linkeschen Bade, drawing by C. Aßmann 1798
