= Sabine Heinefetter =

German operatic soprano

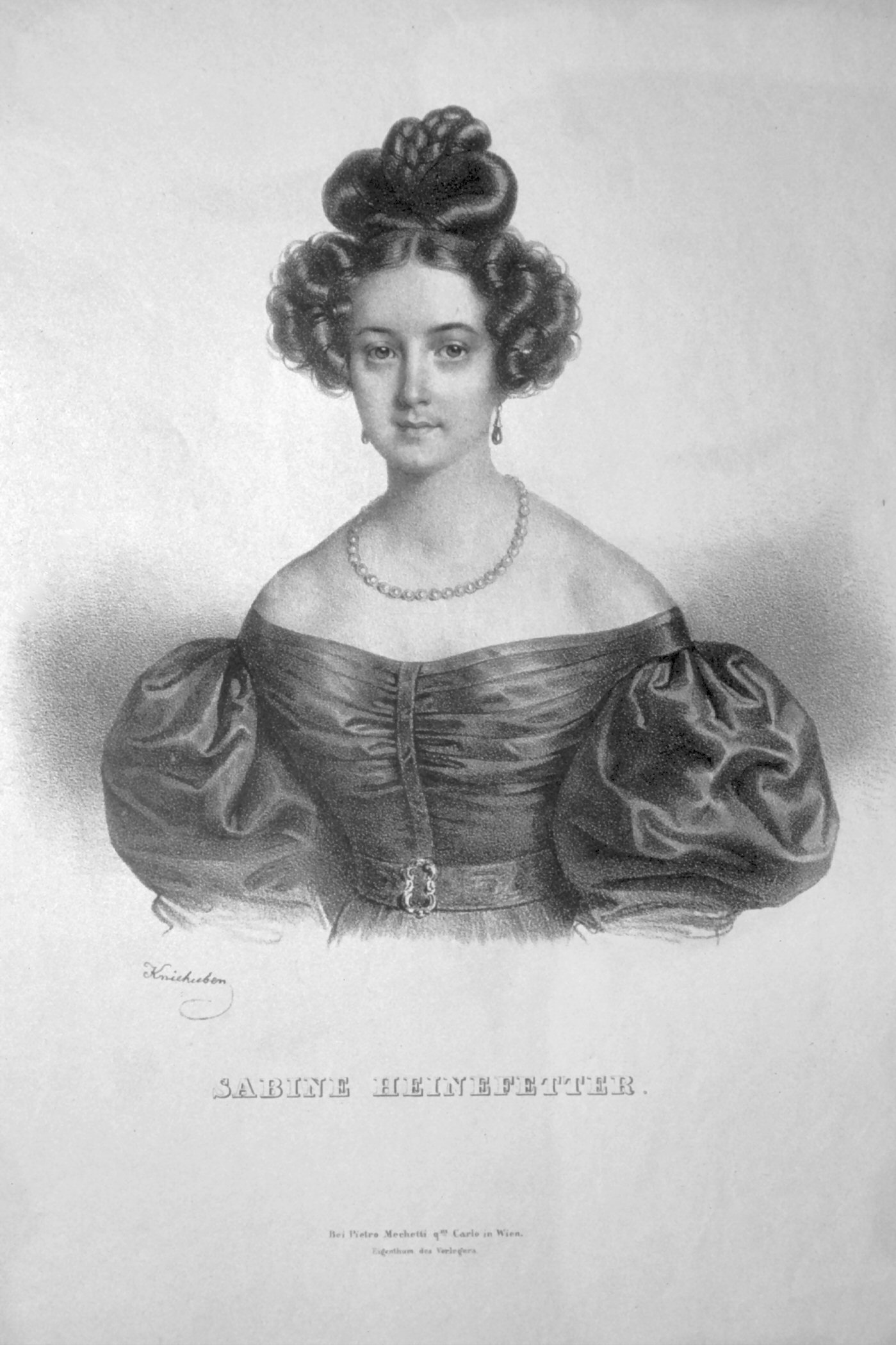
Sabine Heinefetter, lithograph by Josef Kriehuber, 1830

Sabine Heinefetter, marital name Sabine Marquet (19 August 1809, in Mainz – 18 November 1872, in Achern) was a German operatic soprano.

== Life ==
After a stage training she sang for the first time 1824/25 in front of an audience in Frankfurt am Main. In 1826 she sang Pamina in The Magic Flute at the Staatstheater Mainz. She moved to Kassel where she was further taught by Louis Spohr. In Paris she sang alongside Maria Malibran and Franziska Sontag in the Opéra-Comique. In 1829 she returned to Germany. On guest tours she appeared successfully at the Vienna State Opera, 1832 at La Scala and since 1833 at the Königsstädtisches Theater in Berlin. She belonged to the latter for two years. In 1835 Heinefetter was engaged for half a year at the Morettisches Opernhaus.

Since 1842 the soprano lived retired in Baden, and married in Marseille in 1853.

Heinefetter died at age 63 during a stay in the Illenau lunatic asylum. She had five sisters:

- Eva Heinfetter (ca 1810–unknown), Opera singer
- Fatime Heinefetter (unknown–after 1842), Opera singer
- Kathinka Heinefetter (1819–1858), Opera singer
- Klara Stöckl-Heinefetter (1816–1857), Opera singer
- Nanette Heinefetter (life data unknown), Opera singer

as well as a brother, Johann Baptist Heinefetter (1815–1902), who became a painter.

== Hommage ==
In April 2016, the square in front of the Staatstheater Mainz was renamed "Geschwister-Heinefetter-Platz.
