= Angelo Anelli =

Italian poet and librettist (1761–1820)

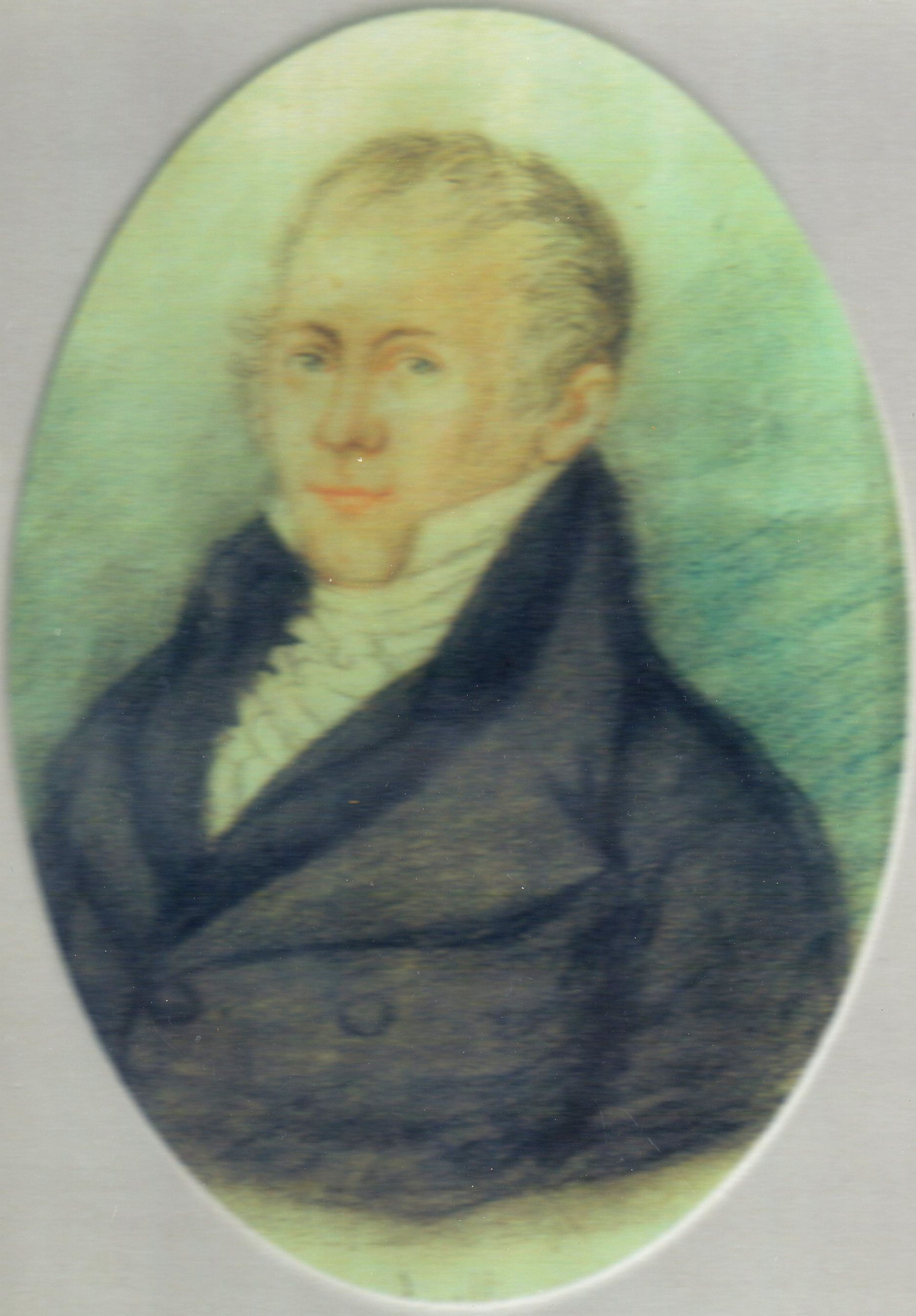
Angelo Anelli

Angelo Anelli (10 November 1761 – 9 April 1820) was an Italian poet and librettist who also wrote under the pseudonyms Marco Landi and Niccolò Liprandi. He was born in Desenzano del Garda and studied literature and poetry at a seminary in Verona. In 1793 he enrolled in the University of Padua, receiving a degree in Canon and Civil Law two years later. Active in the politics of the Cisalpine Republic in his youth, he was imprisoned twice. His 1789 sonnet on the vicissitudes of Italy under Austrian domination, "La calamità d'Italia" (The Calamity of Italy), was for a long time incorrectly attributed to Ugo Foscolo.

From 1799 to 1817, Anello was one of the "house librettists" at La Scala. His opera librettos include those for Rossini's L'italiana in Algeri, Paer's I fuorusciti di Firenze, Usiglio's La secchia rapita, and Pavesi's Ser Marcantonio which later formed the basis for Donizetti's Don Pasquale. He largely abandoned his literary career to return to the legal profession in 1817 when he was appointed professor of procedura giudiziaria (judicial procedure) at the University of Pavia. He died in Pavia at the age of 58.
