= Agnese (opera) =

Agnese is an 1809 semi-serious opera by Ferdinando Paer, to a libretto by Luigi Buonavoglia. It was originally composed for private and amateur performance at the Palazzo Scotti near Parma. The opera became the composer's first major success. In 1814 Agnes ran at La Scala for over 50 nights, more performances than Don Giovanni in the same season, but lost out to Don Giovanni in London in 1817. The composer having moved to Paris he revised Agnese for the Théâtre Italien in 1824 with Giuditta Pasta in the role of Agnese and Marco Bordogni as Ernesto.

== Recordings ==
- Agnese - DVD - María Rey-Joly (Agnese), Edgardo Rocha (Ernesto), Markus Werba (Uberto), Lucia Cirillo (Carlotta), Giulia Della Peruta, Vespina), Andrea Giovannini (Don Girolamo), Filippo Morace (Don Pasquale), Federico Benetti (Il custode dei pazzi) Orchestra e Coro del Teatro Regio di Torino, Diego Fasolis. Dynamic
