= Tonkunst =

Tonkunst, (German: [ˈtoːnˌkʊnst]; "Sound Art" or more literally "The Art of Tone"), is an obsolete term in the German language applied to art music of the 19th century, and often used in music history and musical aesthetic representations. It is sometimes used as a translation for "music" in German, but it holds different connotations than the direct translation ("musik"). It likely originated from the need to give the music a place among the classical arts like architecture, sculpture, painting, prose, and poetry, and also recognize the composer or musician as a creative individual.

== Historical Usage ==
The term "Tonkunst" is seen in myriad contexts historically as an alternate for the word music with a significance of language to heighten the place of music in theory. It's used in relation to renowned musicians and utilised with other discussions of music and musicology, where it continues its current usage today in anthologies and branding.

Heinrich Christoph Koch in his article, "Concerning Fashionable Taste in the Art of Music," ("Über den Modegeschmach in der Tonkunst") utilises the term "Tonkunst" rather than "Musik," something the German Theorist also utilised in "Journal der Tonkunst." This difference is significant in the manner in which Koch places music in the category of other arts rather than the perceived placement as an ephemeral and less respected concept. Despite consumable fashions and trends, Koch perceives beauty as something everlasting rather than fleeting and finds worth in music from the past.

In a similar vein, with "On the Spirit of Music" ("Ueber den Geist der Tonkunst"), Christian Friedrich Michaelis attempted to categorise music within the fine arts, following after the framework of Immanuel Kant in the Critique of Judgment. Michaelis revised and republished, but it was worse received at this point given the critique of Kant's perspectives in music as a philosopher rather than a musician. The term is often found across different historical texts in German talking about music.

The term is found referring to performances by Franz Liszt and Richard Wagner, and in the inscriptions of the Walhalla memorial built in 1842, where a good example is Joseph Haydn, titled as "Doctor der Tonkunst" ("Doctor of Sound-Art") or sometimes gained recognition as "Doctor of Music", and Ludwig van Beethoven self-identified as a "Tondichter" ("Sound-poet"). Adolf Bernhard Marx in contrast utilised the term as a musicologist. The concept of "absolute Tonkunst" ("absolute music") received defence when compared to Wagner's Gesamtkunstwerk by Eduard Hanslick which illustrates its place in discussions of German art music.

Denkmäler deutscher Tonkunst (Monuments of Music) is the name of a musical anthology from Germany, encompassing the Baroque and Classical periods. Guido Adler, who was an editor of the journal, also utilised the term "Tonkunst" while talking about the science of music.

== Contemporary Usage ==
Today, the term is rarely used as it was, but lives on, for example, in the name of the Tonkünstler Orchestra. Other modern-day uses of the term "Tonkunst" include the company Atelier der Tonkunst, which creates audio tools; the magazine for classical music and musicology Die Tonkunst; and the music academy The Akademie für Tonkunst in Darmstadt, Germany. Grove Music Online defines it as a translation for "music" in German.
