= Johann Arnold Kanne =

German philologist and linguist

Johann Arnold Kanne (31 May 1773, Detmold – 17 December 1824, Erlangen) was a German philologist and linguist. In his writings, he used the pseudonyms Johannes Author, Walther Bergius and Anton von Preußen.

Beginning in 1790, he studied theology and classical philology at the University of Göttingen, where he was a pupil of Christian Gottlob Heyne. Later on, he worked as schoolteacher in Halle an der Saale, Hersbruck and Leutenberg, and served as a soldier in both the Austrian and Prussian armies. In 1809, through mediation by author Jean Paul, he became an instructor of archaeology and history at the newly founded "Real Institute" in Nuremberg. In 1818, he was appointed professor of Oriental languages at the University of Erlangen.

Kanne developed a method of "speculative etymology", in which he tried to find the one primordial mythology that decided all others. His method was an attempt to discover the so-called primordial language on which the primordial mythology was based. He postulated that language arose from "root words" for the divine, based on the mystical dynamism of natural phenomena. He further postulated that since root words didn't change, all language evolved from them. He believed that he could reveal these root words by way of an etymology that merged the root words of all archaic languages. His derivation of a general theory of mythology from the etymological method, although scientifically unfounded, was an important influence to the early career of Jacob Grimm.

== Selected works ==
- Ueber die Verwandtschaft der griechischen und teutschen Sprache, 1804 – On the relationship of the Greek and Teutonic languages.
- Neue Darstellung der Mythologie der Griechen und Römer, 1805 – New representation of Greek and Roman mythology.
- Erste Urkunden der Geschichte oder allgemeine Mythologie, 1808 – First documents of history or general mythology.
- Pantheum der ältesten Naturphilosophie, die Religion aller Völker, 1811 – Pantheum of the oldest natural philosophy, the religion of all peoples.
- Sammlung wahrer und erwecklicher Geschichten aus dem Reiche Christi und für dasselbe, 1815–1822.
- Romane aus der Christenwelt, 1817 – Novels from the Christian world.
- Leben und aus dem Leben merkwürdiger und erweckter Christen, 1816–17.
- Christus im Alten Testament, 1818 – Christ in the Old Testament.
- Biblische Untersuchungen und Auslegungen mit und ohne Polemik, 1819–1820 – Biblical studies and designs with and without polemics.
