= Désiré-Alexandre Batton =

French composer (1798–1855)

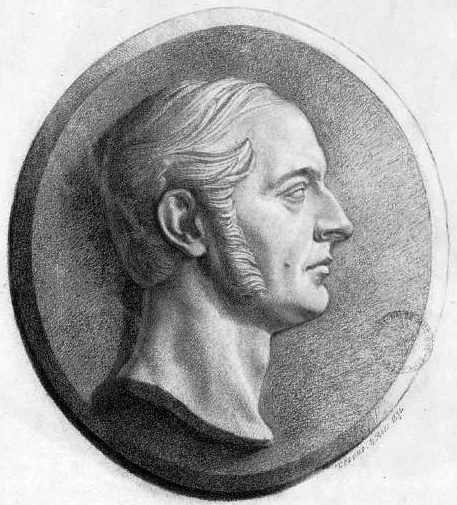
Désiré-Alexandre Batton

Désiré-Alexandre Batton (January 2, 1798 in Paris – October 15, 1855 in Versailles) was a French composer. A student of Luigi Cherubini at the Conservatoire de Paris, he composed operas and cantatas; a number of his operas were seen at the Théâtre Feydeau and the Opéra-Comique. In 1817 he took first second price in the Prix de Rome competition for his cantata La Mort d' Adonis.

It was after winning the prize and when he became associated with Gioachino Rossini that it is believed he introduced the composer to the romantic poem by Walter Scott, The Lady of the Lake, which became the basis of the romantic opera, La donna del lago.

In 1842 Batton became inspector of music schools in France and in 1849 he began teaching at the Conservatoire.

== Works ==
- La Mort d'Adonis, cantata, 1817
- La Reconnaissance, cantata
- Le Prisonnier d'État, opera
- Le camp du drap d'or, opera
- La fenêtre secrète, opera, 1818
- Velleda, opera, 1820
- Ethelvina, opera, 1827
- La marquise de Brinvilliers, opera, 1831
- Le Remplacant, opera, 1837
