= Orphée et Euridice (Paer) =

1791 one-act opera

For the Monteverdi opera, see L'Orfeo, for the opera by Gluck, see Orfeo ed Euridice.

Orphée et Euridice is a one-act opera, composed by Italian composer Ferdinando Paer in 1791, performed in French with a French-language libretto. The opera was the first stage work by Paer. After becoming Maestro di cappella in Parma, he wrote the work.

Following the success of his first, he quickly moved onto his second work, Circe, an opera based on the Persian Ruler Xerxes I. His 1792 opera, Le astuzie amorose, was also successful with the public.
