= Kathinka Heinefetter =

German operatic soprano (1819–1858)

Kathinka Heinefetter, also Cathinka Heinefetter (12 September 1819 – 20 December 1858) was a German operatic soprano.

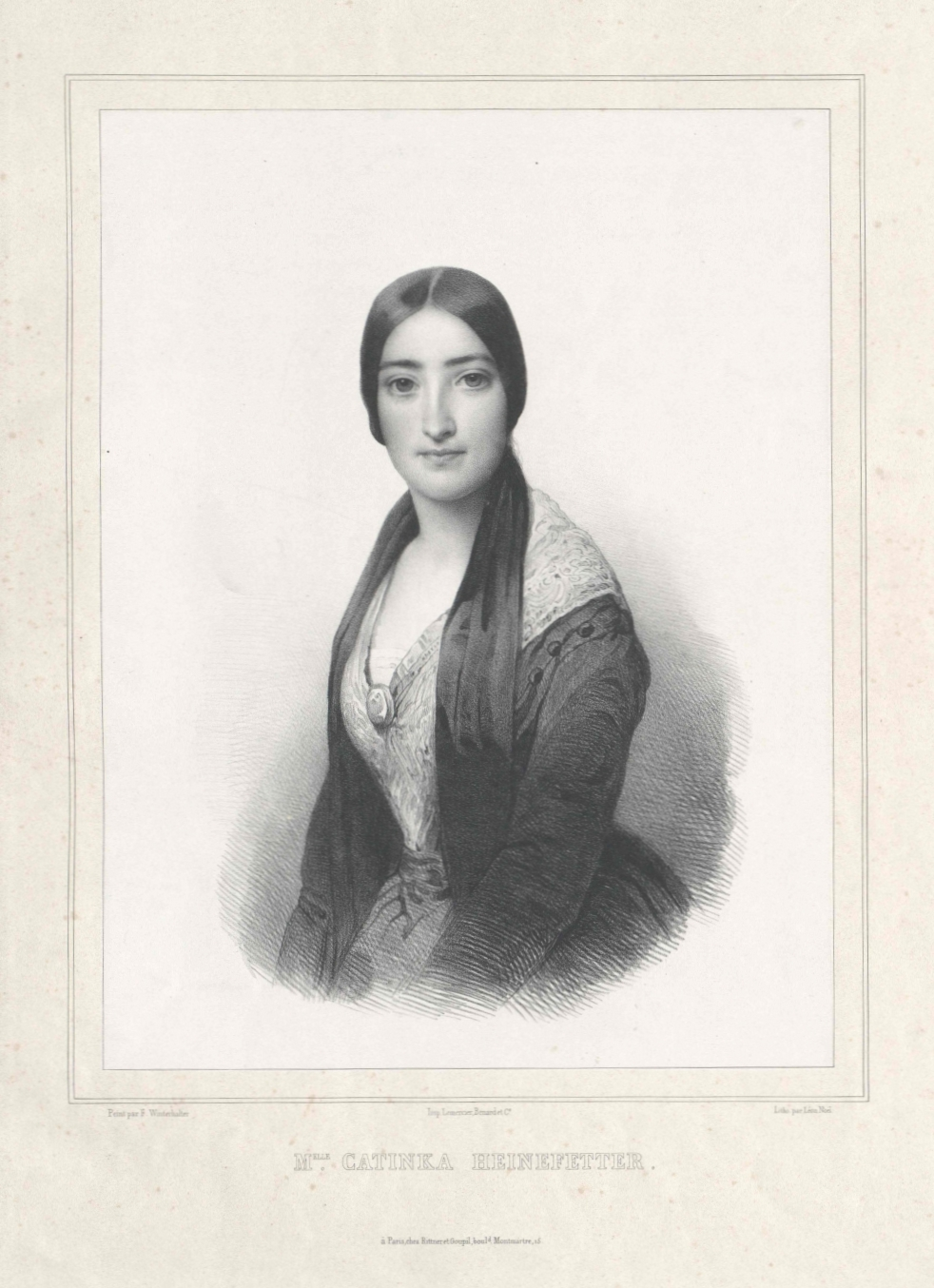
Lithograph after the painting by Franz Xaver Winterhalter

== Life ==
Heinefetter was born into a poor Jewish family in Mainz and was one of five Heinefetter sisters, all of whom were able to develop stage careers. Kathinka received her vocal training from her older sister Sabine. In 1837, she made her debut at the Frankfurt Opera as Agathe in the opera Der Freischütz by Carl Maria von Weber. In 1840, she had significant success at the Paris Opera.

In 1842, she received an engagement at La Monnaie in Brussels. It was there, on the night of 20/21 November 1842, that the once much-discussed tragic incident occurred. In her flat, the Parisian lawyer Eduard Caumartin stabbed his colleague and rival, Count Aimé Sirey, with a rapier. After this scandal, she left Brussels.

From 1850, she sang again at the Paris Opéra, then at the opera houses in Hamburg, Berlin, Vienna and Budapest. Her major roles included the title role in Norma by Vincenzo Bellini, Rachel in La Juive by Jacques Fromental Halévy, Valentine in Les Huguenots by Giacomo Meyerbeer and Agathe in Carl Maria von Weber's Der Freischütz.

Heinefetter retired from the stage in 1858 and settled in Freiburg im Breisgau, where she died of heart disease in December at the age of 39.

== In memory ==
In April 2016, the square in front of the Staatstheater Mainz was renamed "Geschwister-Heinefetter-Platz".
