= Klara Stöckl-Heinefetter =

German operatic soprano

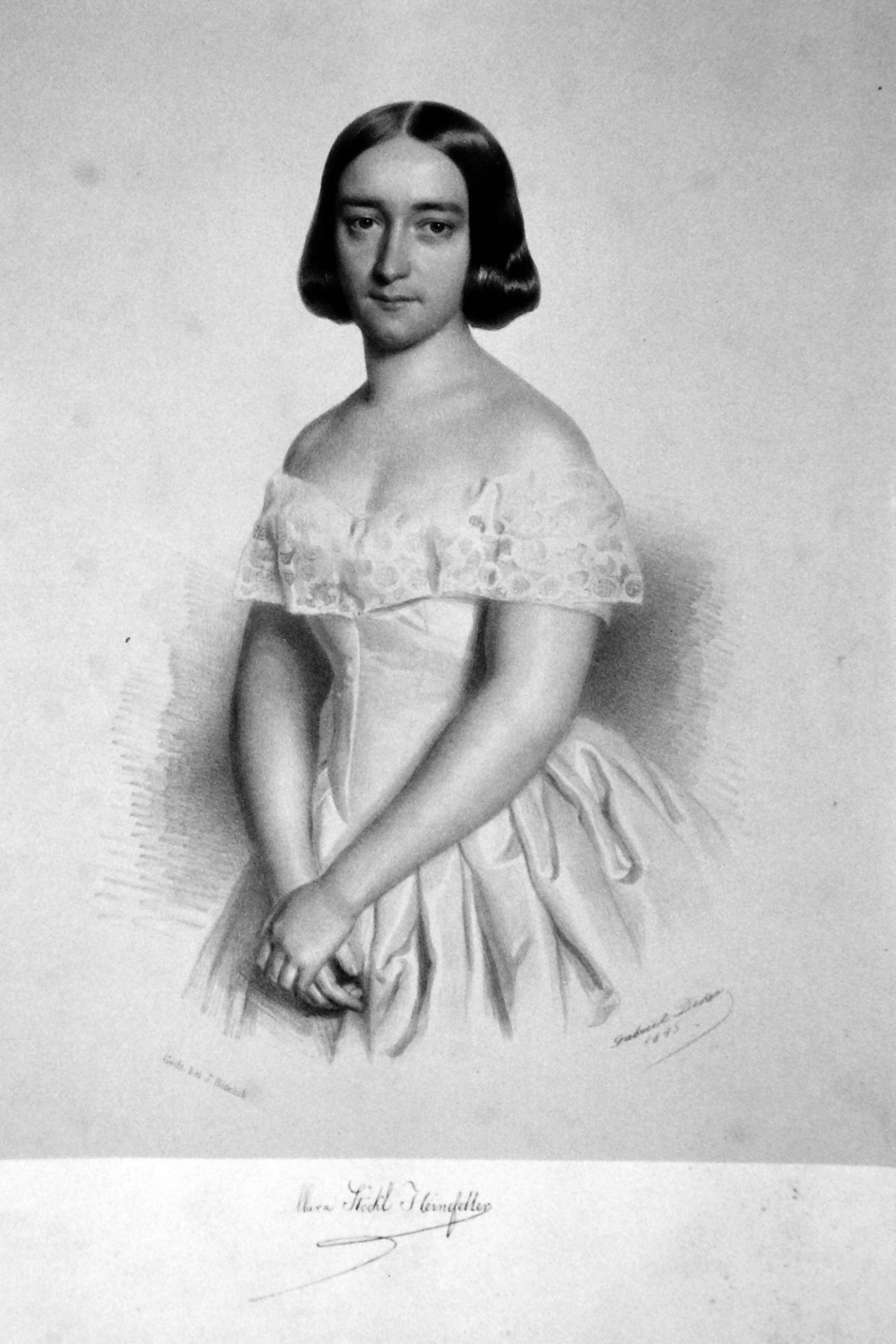
Portrait of Klara Stöckl-Heinefetter

Klara Maria Stöckl-Heinefetter, also Clara Stöckl-Heinefetter (17 February 1816 – 24 February 1857) was a German operatic soprano.

== Life ==
Heinefetter was born into a poor Jewish family in Mainz and was one of five Heinefetter sisters, all of whom were able to develop stage careers. Initially, she was trained musically and vocally by her older sister Sabine. In 1829, she accompanied her to Paris, where the prima donna Maria Malibran took notice of her and instructed her in singing. In 1831, Klara came to Vienna with her sister and made her debut on 16 January 1832 as Agathe in Der Freischütz by Carl Maria von Weber at the Theater am Kärntnertor. She subsequently received a three-year engagement there and was used in smaller roles.

After further vocal training with Giuseppe Ciccimarra in Vienna, she sang Donna Elvira in Don Giovanni by Mozart, Romeo in I Capuleti e i Montecchi by Vincenzo Bellini, the page in Jean de Paris by François-Adrien Boieldieu, the Countess Reuberholm in Le Bal masqué by Daniel-François-Esprit Auber, Camille in Zampa by Ferdinand Hérold, Irma in Le maçon by Daniel-François-Esprit Auber, the queen in Le Pré aux Clercs by Ferdinand Hérold and other large parts.

In 1834, she undertook a guest performance tour to Munich, Berlin, Mannheim, Stuttgart and Dresden. From 1836 to 1839, she was again engaged at the Vienna Court Opera. On 27 June 1837, she married the dancer and mimic Franz Xaver Stöckl in Budapest and from then on went by the name "Stöckl-Heinefetter". When she travelled to Vienna with her sister in October 1843, she received an engagement at the Theater am Kärntnertor for four and a half years. In the period 1845-1847 she was again a permanent member of the Vienna Court Opera.

In 1840, she sang as a guest at the Royal Opera House in Covent Garden and St. James Theatre in London the part of Agathe in Der Freischütz and the Jessonda by Louis Spohr, in 1841, in Vienna, the title character in Jessonda by Louis Spohr and in 1842 Valentine in Les Huguenots by Giacomo Meyerbeer. She made guest appearances at the Deutsches Theater Pest in 1837, 1839 and 1844, at the German theatres of Prague and Brno in 1839, at the opera house of Lemberg in 1843 and at the theatre of Graz in 1844 and 1844.

When her husband was appointed director of the Landestheater Linz in 1849, she moved to Linz. After the birth of a child, she lost her voice in 1850 and had to give up the stage. A progressive nervous condition broke out and she was committed to the insane asylum in Döbling near Vienna in 1855. She died on 24 February 1857 in the Allgemeines Krankenhaus der Stadt Wien aged 41.

== In remembrance ==
In April 2016, the square in front of the Staatstheater Mainz was renamed "Geschwister-Heinefetter-Platz".
