= Ferdinando Paer =

Italian composer (1771–1839)

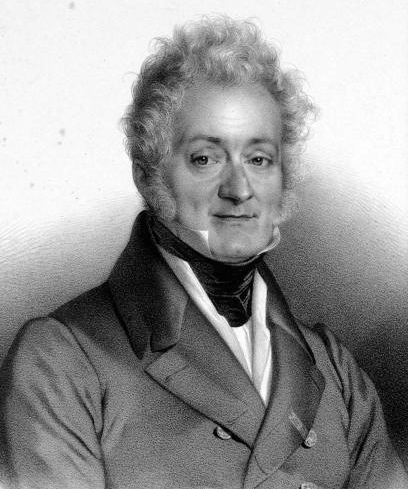
- Lithograph by François Delpech
- Born: Ferdinando Paer; 1 June 1771; Parma
- Died: 3 May 1839 (aged 67); Paris
- Occupation: Composer
- Organizations: Kärntnertortheater; Morettisches Opernhaus; Opéra-Italien
- Works: List of operas

Ferdinando Paer (1 June 1771 – 3 May 1839) was an Italian composer known for his operas. He was of Austrian descent and used the German spelling Pär in application for printing in Venice, and later in France the spelling Paër.

== Life ==
He was born in Parma into a family of Austrian descent. He came from a musical family. His grandfather Michael Pär was a regimental band member from Peterwardein (today Petrovaradin, part of Novi Sad). His father Giulio Paer was a trumpeter with the Ducal Bodyguards and also performed at church and court events; his mother was Francesca Cutica. He was named Ferdinando after Duke Ferdinand of Parma by Archduchess Maria Amalia of Austria, Duke Ferdinand's wife. He studied music theory under the violinist Gasparo Ghiretti, a pupil of the Conservatorio della Pietà de' Turchini in Naples.

== Career ==
His first stage work, Orphée et Euridice, premiered in 1791 and helped begin a fruitful career of composing for the young composer. His first Italian opera, Circe, was given during the Carnival of Venice in 1792; others rapidly followed, and his name was soon famous throughout Italy. At the age of 20, he became choirmaster in Venice. In 1797, he went to Vienna, where his future wife, the singer Francesca Riccardi, had obtained an engagement. There he became music director of the Kärntnertortheater until 1801, where he produced a series of operas, including his Camilla (1799) and his Achille (1801). He enjoyed the patronage of the music-loving Empress Marie Therese, composing several works for her private concerts. In 1802 he was appointed composer to the court theatre at Dresden, the Morettisches Opernhaus, where his wife was also engaged as a singer, and in 1804 a lifetime appointment of Court Kapellmeister was bestowed upon him by Elector Frederick August.

His opera Leonora (1804) is based on the same story as Beethoven's Fidelio, first produced as Leonora the following year. Beethoven had a high opinion of Paer, once jesting that the funeral march in Achille was so fine he "would have to compose it".

In 1807 Napoleon, while in Dresden, took a fancy to him and took him with him to Warsaw and Paris at a salary of 28,000 francs. He composed a bridal march for Napoleon's wedding to Marie Louise, Duchess of Parma (a religious ceremony that took place on 2 April 1810).

In 1809, he composed his most famous opera, Agnese, a dramma semiserio per musica in two acts. Its success spread throughout Europe, and it was performed at the most important theatres (Milan, Naples, Rome, Vienna, London and Paris). It had a deep influence on the following generations of composers and aroused the admiration of many celebrated musicians and musical critics such as Stendhal, Berlioz, Castil-Blaze and Chopin. The primary reason for this success is most certainly the high quality of the music involved, but the dramaturgical structure also presents significant material such as the mad scene involving Agnese's father Uberto (bass).

In 1812, he succeeded Gaspare Spontini as conductor of the Opéra-Italien in Paris. He retained this post after the Restoration while accepting those of chamber composer to the king and conductor of the private orchestra of the Duke of Orléans. In 1823, he retired from the Opéra-Italien and was succeeded by Gioachino Rossini. It was around this time that he taught composition to the young Franz Liszt. In 1831, he was elected to the Académie des Beaux-Arts, and in 1832 was appointed conductor of the royal orchestra of King Louis Philippe.

In 1824, he was parodied by Daniel Auber in the role of Signor Astucio in Le concert à la cour.

During the 1820s, Paër's success both as a composer and teacher were being frustrated with the presence of Giacomo Rossini and influence of writer Marie-Henri Beyle. Rossini, having left his appointment at the Italian Theater of Paris_{[fr]} in 1826, had left Paër in charge of the failing theatre. In 1827, he was fired from his position but later issued an open letter, "M. Paër, ex-directeur du Théâtre de l'Opéra Italien, à MM. les Dilettanti," detailing his self-defense.

In 1831, Paër was quickly employed in the Académie des Beaux-Arts and became a strong contributor to the opera culture at the Opéra-Comique alongside colleagues like Daniel Auber and Felice Blangini.

For the remainder of his life, he would many different appointments in institutions of musical education. However, in 1834 Paer would premiere one of the last operas which would bestow upon him great public success. Namely, his comic opera, Un caprice de femme, premiered at the Opéra-Comique in 1834.

On May 3, 1839 Paër died in his Paris apartment at the age of 67, and had his funeral conducted at the Church of Saint-Roch three days later.

== Works ==
Paer wrote a total of 55 operas, in the Italian Classical styles of Paisiello and Cimarosa. His other works, including several religious compositions, cantatas, many songs and a short list of orchestral chamber pieces.

Oratorio

- 1803: Il Santo Sepolcro / La Passione di Gesù Cristo

== Honors ==
- La Légion d'honneur (June 9, 1816)
