= Héléna (opera) =

- Opéra comique by Étienne Méhul
- Title page of the libretto, Paris 1803
- Librettist: Jean-Nicolas Bouilly
- Language: French
- Premiere: 1 March 1803; Opéra-Comique (Théâtre Favart), Paris

Héléna is an opera in three acts by the French composer Étienne Méhul. It premiered at the Opéra-Comique in Paris on 1 March 1803. The libretto is by Jean-Nicolas Bouilly. It enjoyed 36 performances in the space of 20 months before disappearing from the theatre's repertoire. Bouilly was accused of basing the plot too closely on Cherubini's Les deux journées. According to the musicologist Elizabeth Bartlet, "several scholars have pointed out [that] Beethoven's trumpet call in Fidelio was inspired by Méhul's Héléna".

== Roles ==
Role	Voice type	Premiere Cast
Constantin, Count of Arles	haute-contre	Jean-Baptiste-Sauveur Gavaudan
Edmond, believed to be the Count of Arles	haute-contre	Pierre Gaveaux
Héléna, Princess of Tarascon, wife of Constantin, disguised as a shepherd under the name "Petit Jacques"	soprano	Julie-Angélique Scio
Adolphe, aged seven, disguised under the name Paul, Constantin and Héléna's only son	soprano	Mlle Simonet
Maurice, a rich farmer	basse-taille (bass-baritone)	Antoine Juillet, called 'Juliet' (père)
Anna, Maurice's only daughter	soprano	Mme Gavaudan
Urbain, a farmhand in the service of Maurice, in love with Anna	haute-contre	Mr. Le Sage
The governor of Arles	haute-contre	Philippe Cauvy, called 'Philippe'
A squire	spoken	Mr. Cellier
Chorus: Knights; villagers; shepherds and shepherdesses; guards and soldiers; people

== Synopsis ==
Méhul in 1799; portrait by Antoine Gros

Constantin, Count of Arles, has been accused of killing his father. He flees with his wife Héléna to escape the anger of the common people, egged on by the new count, Romuald. The couple wander through forests trying to escape their pursuers. Their situation becomes so bad that they have to hand their four-year-old son to be brought up under the name "Paul" to a kindly farmer, Maurice. Héléna later takes refuge with Maurice too (without him knowing her identity) and disguises herself as a shepherd, "Petit Jacques". Urbain, a local farmhand in love with Maurice's daughter Anna, becomes jealous of "Petit Jacques", thinking "he" is a rival for Anna's love. Maurice finally recognises Héléna; she convinces him of her husband's innocence and Maurice vows to keep her secret. The governor of Arles issues a proclamation ordering all strangers in the region to declare their true identity. Constantin, disguised as a reaper, is reunited with his wife. He tells her that on learning the death of Count Romuald, he returned to Arles, trusting the honesty of Romuald's son Edmond, but Edmond has given orders to hunt him down. The governor arrives and interrogates Paul, forcing Héléna to reveal her true identity. The governor takes them to Arles. Edmond is determined to find Constantin and asks the captive Héléna where he is. The people demand that Héléna and her son should be executed unless Constantin surrenders himself so Constantin is forced to comply. However, Edmond asks for a private interview with him and reveals that on his deathbed Romuald confessed to the murder of Constantin's father. Edmond persuades the people of Constantin's innocence and the opera ends happily.

== Sources ==
- Printed score: Héléna//Opéra en 3 Actes,//Paroles de J. N. Bouilly,//Membre de la Société Philotechnique//Mis en Musique//et Dédié//à Monsieur Fontaine-Cramayel,//Préfet du Palais du Gouvernement, Chargé de//la Surintendance de l'Opéra Comique National.//Par Méhul//Membre de l'Institut, et l'un des Inspecteurs//du Conservatoire de Musique, Paris, Magasin de Musique Cherubini Méhul Kreutzer Rode Isouard and Boildieu, s.d. (accessible for free online at Gallica - B.N.F.)
- Adélaïde de Place Étienne Nicolas Méhul (Bleu Nuit Éditeur, 2005)
- Arthur Pougin Méhul: sa vie, son génie, son caractère (Fischbacher, 1889)
- General introduction to Méhul's operas in the introduction to the edition of Stratonice by M. Elizabeth C. Bartlet (Pendragon Press, 1997)
