= La caverne =

Opera by Jean-François Le Sueur

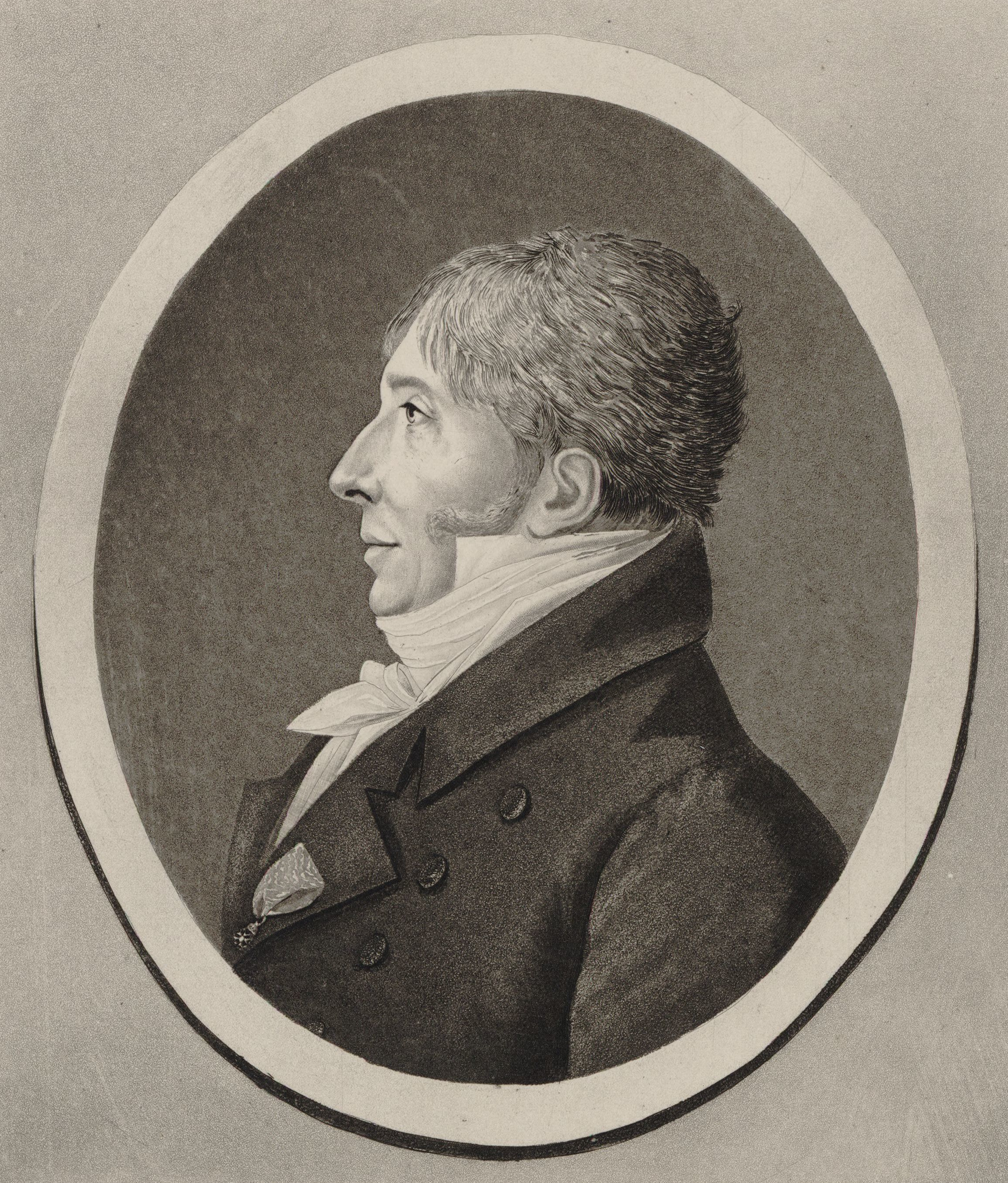
Jean-François Le Sueur, the opera's composer

La caverne, ou Le repentir (French pronunciation: [la kavɛʁn u lə ʁəpɑ̃tiʁ], The Cavern, or Repentance) is an opera in three acts by French composer Jean-François Le Sueur. It was first performed at the Théâtre Feydeau, Paris, on 16 February 1793. The libretto, by Alphonse François "Paul" Palat-Dercy, is based on an episode from Lesage's novel Gil Blas. La caverne was the first opera by Le Sueur to be staged and it became one of the most popular works of the French Revolutionary era. The opera was notable for its innovative set design: the stage was divided horizontally, with the lower section representing the cavern of the title (a robbers' den) and the upper section showing a forest. Two levels of action were thus able to be shown simultaneously.

== Roles ==
Roles, voice types, premiere cast
Role	Voice type	Premiere cast, 16 February 1793
Gil Blas	tenor	Jean-Baptiste-Sauveur Gavaudan
Rolando	bass	Châteaufort
Séraphine	soprano	Julie-Angélique Scio
Don Alphonse	tenor	Pierre Gaveaux
Léonarde	soprano	Verteuil
Roustan	baritone	
Bernard	tenor	
Charles	tenor	

== Synopsis ==
Gil Blas is captured by a robber band led by Rolando, who hold him in their den (the cavern of the title) along with the noblewoman Séraphine. Séraphine's husband comes looking for her disguised as a blind beggar but he too is caught by the robbers. Rolando repents and discovers he is Séraphine's brother. In the finale, Gil Blas, who has managed to escape, brings a rescue party, who shoot the robbers and free the prisoners.
