= François Bernard-Valville =

French writer and playwright (1767–1828)

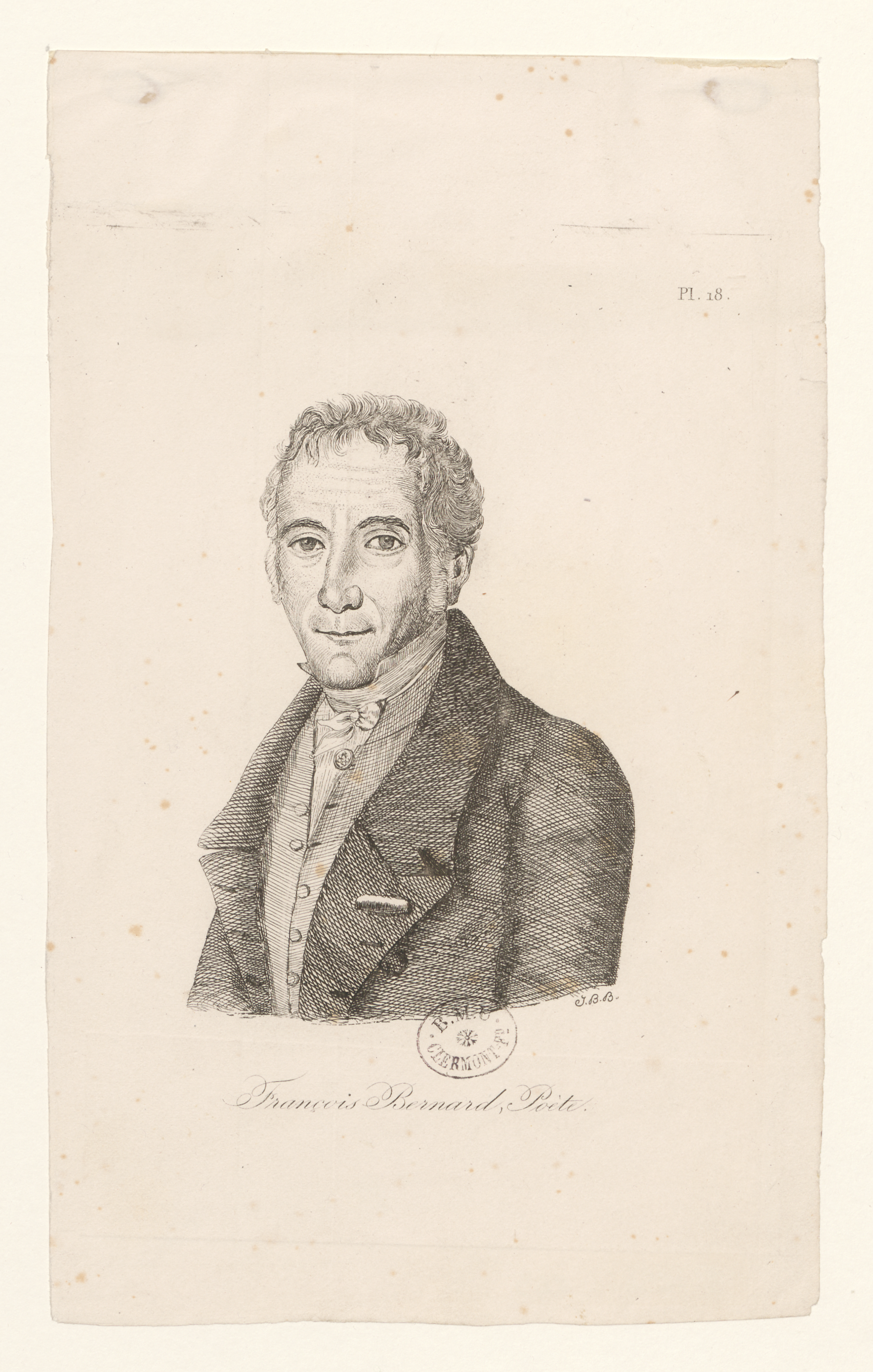
- Born: François Marcellin Bernard-Valville; 6 February 1767; Clermont-Ferrand
- Died: 15 October 1828 (aged 61); Paris
- Occupations: Playwright librettist

François Marcellin Bernard-Valville (6 February 1767 – 15 October 1828) was a French playwright and librettist.

== Biography ==
The son of a lawyer of Clermont, his studies led him to theater, where he played a few years under the name Bernard-Valville, before turning to playwriting, with some success. He arrived in Paris in 1795 and staged his plays in several Parisian theaters. But the career of arms attracted him: he accompanied General Decaen to Pondicherry and Mauritius Island when the latter became governor, and continued his career in France until the collapse of the Empire. The uncertain period following the Hundred Days prompted him to return to Mauritius, where he was appointed deputy headmaster of the Royal College in Port-Louis, where he also taught rhetoric. He returned to Paris later in life, where he eventually died.

Jacques Bernard, also a military (captain of hussards) and poet died in 1842, was his twin brother.

His plays were presented on the most important Parisian stages of his time including the Théâtre de la Gaîté and the Théâtre Feydeau.

== Works ==
- 1794: Les Deux perruques, comédie nouvelle in one act and in verse
- c.1795: Le Miguelet, one-act opera
- 1799: Les Deux tableaux parlans ou le Dîner interrompu, one-act comedy in prose
- 1799: L'Horloge de bois, ou Un Trait d'humanité, one-act comedy, mingled with vaudevilles
- 1799: L'Épicière bel-esprit, one-act comedy, in prose, with Étienne Gosse
- 1799: La Lanterne magique, ou le Retour des époux, one-act comedy
- 1799: Marcelin, one-act opera, in prose
- 1799: Le Petit Gagne-Petit, ou l'Erreur d'une mère, one-act comey, in prose, mingled with vaudevilles
- 1799: Pygmalion à Saint-Maur, one-act farce-anecdotique and vaudevilles, with Étienne Crétu and Gosse
- 1800: Augustine et Benjamin, ou le Sargines de village, one-act opéra comique, with Eugène Hus
- 1800: Kiki, ou l'Île imaginaire, three-act comedie-folie, in prose, with Hus
- 1800: Le trompeur trompé, one-act opéra comique, in prose, with Pierre Gaveaux
- 1801: Vert-Vert, ou le Perroquet de Nevers, one-act opéra comique, in prose
- 1810: Henriette et Adhémar, ou, La bataille de Fontenoy, with Louis-Charles Caigniez, three-act melodrama, in prose
- 1820: Épître à mon frère, en réponse à la sienne
- 1822: Le Dépit amoureux, comédie de Molière, remise in two acts by Bernard-Valville

== Bibliography ==
- Joseph Marie Quérard, La France littéraire ou dictionnaire bibliographique des savants..., 1839, (p. 34)
- Joann Elart, Catalogue des fonds musicaux conservés en Haute-Normandie, 2004, (p. 217)
