= L'hôtellerie portugaise =

L'Hôtellerie portugaise
- Opera by Luigi Cherubini
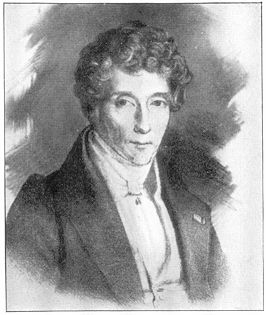
- Luigi Cherubini
- Librettist: Étienne Aignan
- Language: French
- Premiere: 25 July 1798; Théâtre Feydeau, Paris

L'Hôtellerie portugaise is an opéra comique in 1 act by Luigi Cherubini. The opera uses a French language libretto by Étienne Aignan. The work premiered on 25 July 1798 in Paris at the Théâtre Feydeau.

== Roles ==
Role	Voice type	Premiere cast, 25 July 1798 (Conductor: )
Don Carlos	tenor	Rézicourt
Gabriella	soprano	Juliette Lesage
Pedrillo	baritone	Jausserand
Rodrigo	bass	Alexis Dessaules
Ines	soprano	Augustine Lesage
Don Roselbo	baritone	Dérubelle
Inigo	baritone	Raffile
