= Claude-François Fillette-Loraux =

French writer and librettist (1753–1821)

Claude-François Fillette-Loraux (1753–1821) was an 18th–19th-century French playwright and librettist for operas and opéras comiques.

== Works ==
Opéras comiques

- 1787: L'Amant à l'épreuve, ou la Dame invisible, two-act opera, libretto by P.-L. Moline and C.-F. Fillette-Loraux, after Le Roman comique by Paul Scarron, created at Comédie-Italienne (Salle Favart) 5 December, music by Henri Montan Berton.
- 1791: Lodoïska, three-act opéra comique, created at Théâtre Feydeau 21 July, music by Luigi Cherubini.
- 1794: Agricol Viala, ou le Héros de la Durance, opéra comique in one act and in prose, libretto by Fillette-Loraux, music by Henri Montan Berton, created 9 October at Théâtre Feydeau.
- 1813: Valentin ou le Paysan romanesque, three-act opéra comique, music by Henri Montan Berton, libretto by Louis-Benoît Picard and Fillette-Loraux, with Mme Belmont in the role of Isabelle, premiered at Opéra-Comique salle Feydeau 13 September.

Theatre plays

- 1816: La Rivale d'elle-même, comedy in three acts and in verse, premiered at Théâtre de l'Odéon 6 July.
