= Eliza (Cherubini) =

Opéra comique in two acts by Cherubini

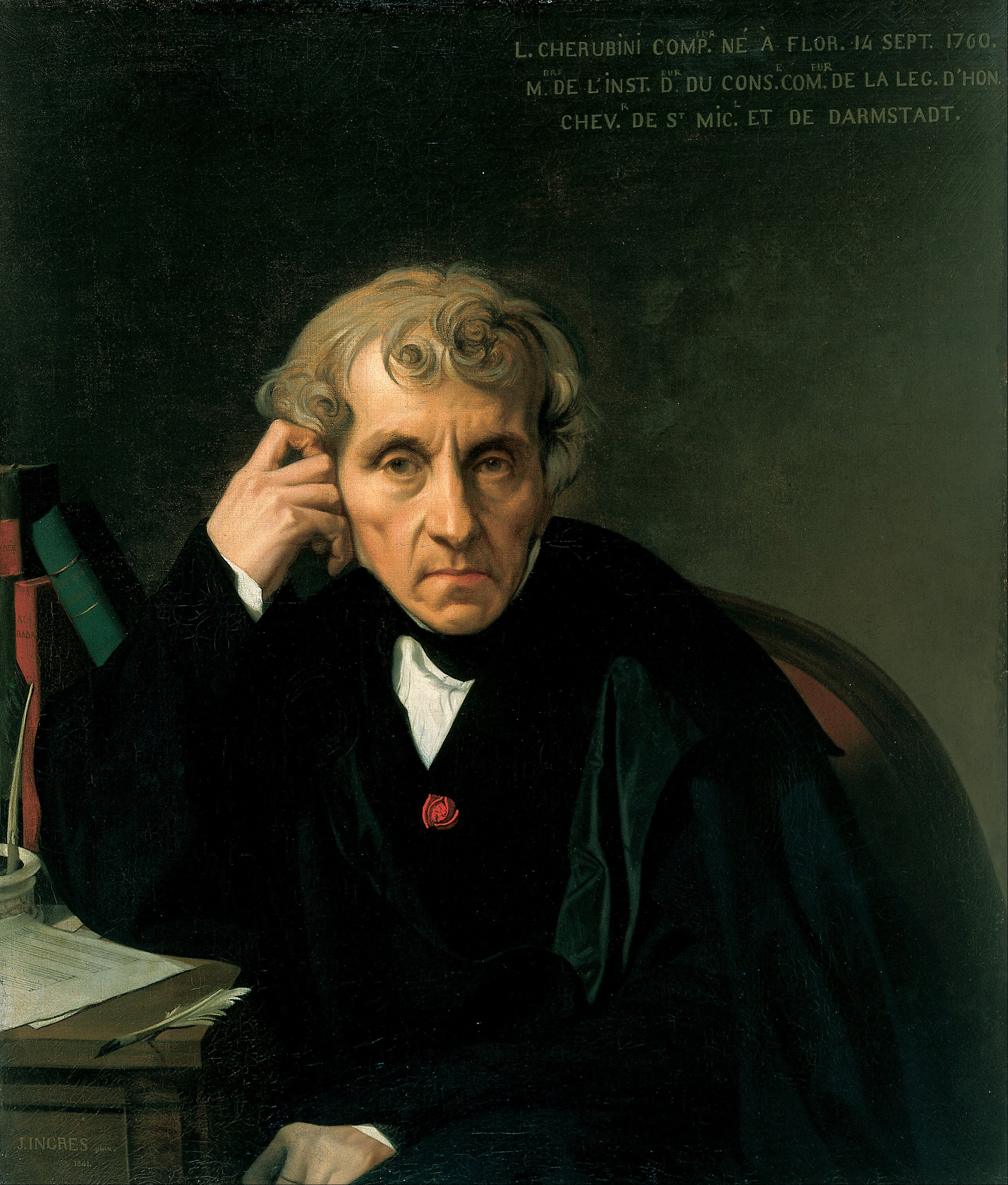
Luigi Cherubini

Eliza, ou Le voyage aux glaciers du Mont St Bernard (Eliza, or The Journey to the Glaciers of Mont St Bernard) is an opéra comique in two acts by Luigi Cherubini with a French libretto by Jacques-Antoine de Révéroni Saint-Cyr. It was first performed at the Théâtre Feydeau, Paris on 13 December 1794.

Cherubini made great use of local colour in his music for Eliza. Its setting in the Swiss Alps was probably inspired by the contemporary popularity of Jean-Jacques Rousseau. The score includes a ranz des vaches, a traditional melody played by Swiss herdsmen. Eliza marked an important stage in the development of French Romanticism and was also popular in Germany. Cherubini's musical evocation of nature (nightfall, the storm) influenced Carl Maria von Weber, who was particularly fond of the opera.

Beethoven's Fifth Symphony finale includes a long chord sequence – a pattern that was borrowed from Cherubini, whom Beethoven "esteemed the most" among his contemporary musicians. Cherubini employed this pattern consistently to close his overtures, which Beethoven knew well. The ending of his Fifth Symphony (1804–1808) repeats almost note by note and pause by pause the conclusion of Cherubini's overture to Eliza, presented in Vienna in 1803.

== Roles ==
Roles, voice types, premiere cast
Cast	Voice type	Premiere, 13 December 1794
Eliza	soprano	Julie-Angélique Scio
Laure, her chambermaid	soprano	
Florindo, a painter from Genoa	tenor	Pierre Gaveaux
Germain, his servant	bass	
The Prior of the Hospice of Mont Saint Bernard	bass	Jean-Blaise Martin
A mountain guide	soprano	
Michel, a muleteer	tenor	

== Synopsis ==
Florindo and Eliza are in love but Eliza's father forbids the couple to marry. Florindo and his servant Germain travel to the Great St Bernard Pass where they are welcomed by the prior of the local monastery. Florindo receives a letter which makes him believe that Eliza is now engaged to another man. He sets off for the nearby glacier, intending to kill himself. Eliza arrives at the monastery bringing news of her father's death which will enable her to marry Florindo. She finds his farewell note and goes to rescue him with the help of the monks and mountain guides.

A violent storm blows up and starts an avalanche which engulfs Florindo, but the monks save him and he is finally reunited with Eliza.
