= Physiognotrace =

Drawing instrument

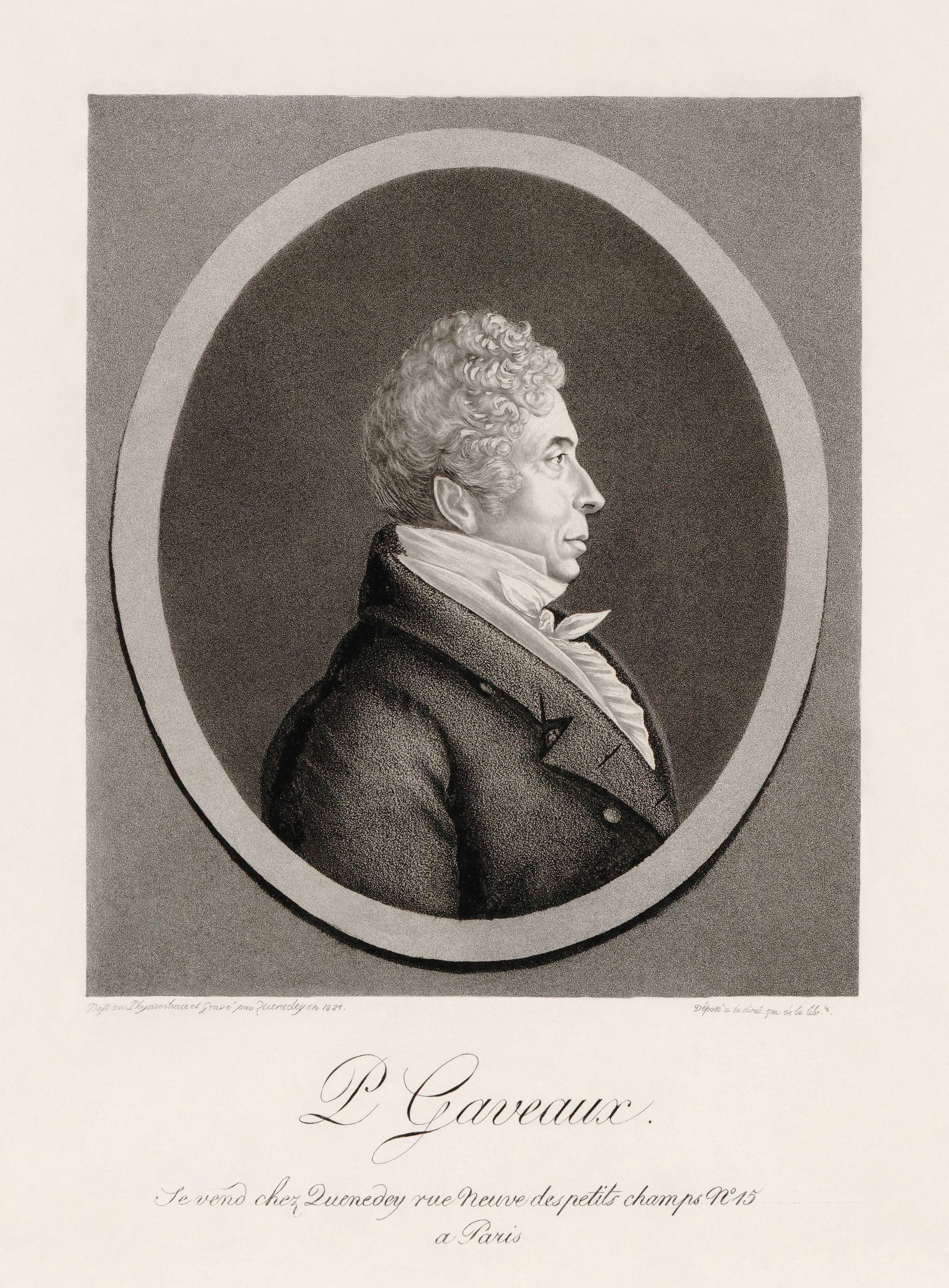
Pierre Gaveaux, 1821, by Edme Quenedey (1756–1830) after a physiognotrace

A physiognotrace is an instrument, designed to trace a person's physiognomy to make semi-automated portrait aquatints. Invented in France in 1783–1784, it was popular for some decades. The sitter climbed into a wooden frame (1.75m high x 0.65m wide), sat and turned to the side to pose. A pantograph connected to a pencil produced within a few minutes a "grand trait", a contour line on a piece of paper. With the help of a second scaling-down pantograph, the basic features of the portrait were transferred from the sheet in the form of dotted lines to a copper plate, which had previously been prepared with a ground for etching. One week later, the sitter received an etched plate and twelve little prints. The device but also the aquatint prints are called physiognotraces.

== History ==
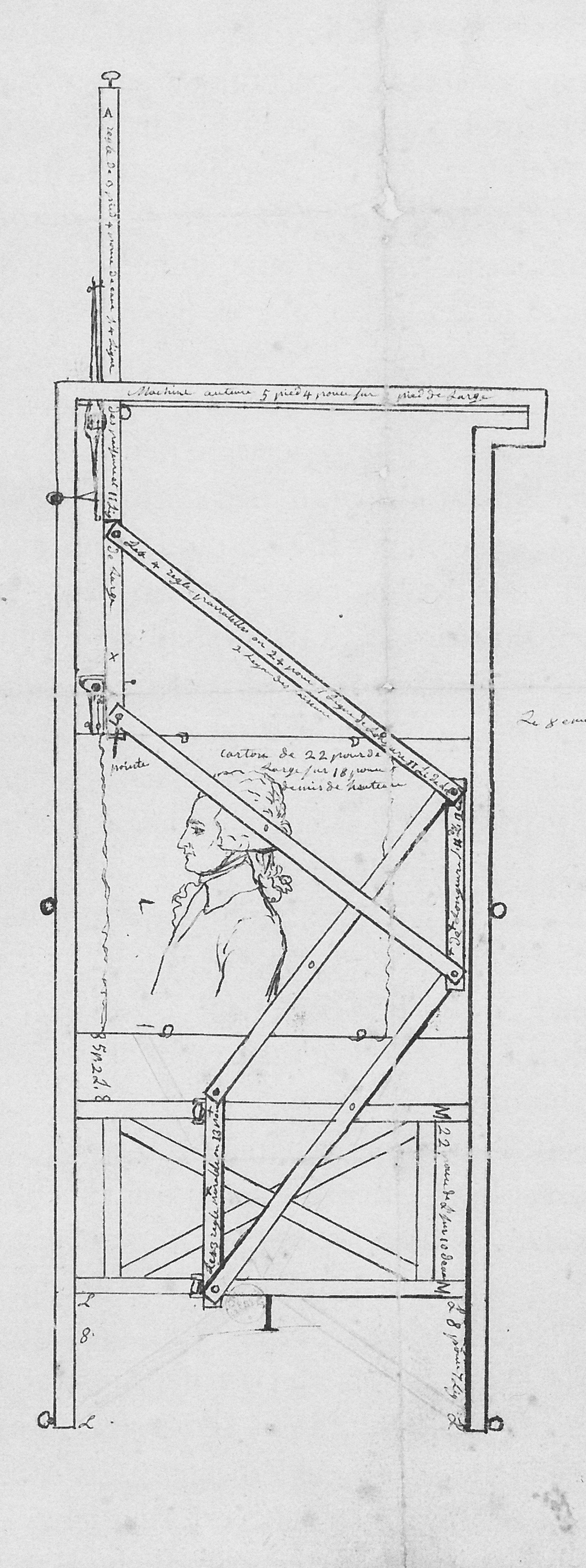
Quenedey's drawing of the tool

In 1783–1784, the Frenchman Gilles-Louis Chrétien invented the "physionotrace" to aid in the production of silhouette portraits, which became popular during the reign of Louis XVI. Within a few minutes, a "grand trait" was produced. The life-size drawing was completed by an artist. Chrétien's device used the mechanics of the pantograph to transmit the tracing (via an eyepiece) of the subject's profile silhouette to an engraving needle. Thus, it enabled the production of multiple portrait copies. Chrétien's first partner, Edme Quenedey, made a drawing of the instrument in 1788 that is now in the Bibliothèque Nationale de France. When Quenedey started his own business in Germany, Chrétien cooperated with the artist Jean-Baptiste Fouquet, and Jean Simon Fournier. Chrétien's workshop was taken over by Edme Bouchardy.

In 1802, John Isaac Hawkins, who was born in England in 1772 and lived in Philadelphia, Pennsylvania, patented the second official physiognotrace and partnered with Charles Willson Peale to market it to prospective buyers. Hawkins's machine differed from Chrétien's in that it traced around the actual face with a small bar connected to a pantograph that reduced the silhouette to less than two inches. Many versions of those instruments were then used all over the East Coast of the United States, some of which predated Hawkins's, and they were capable of quickly making machine-made profiles.

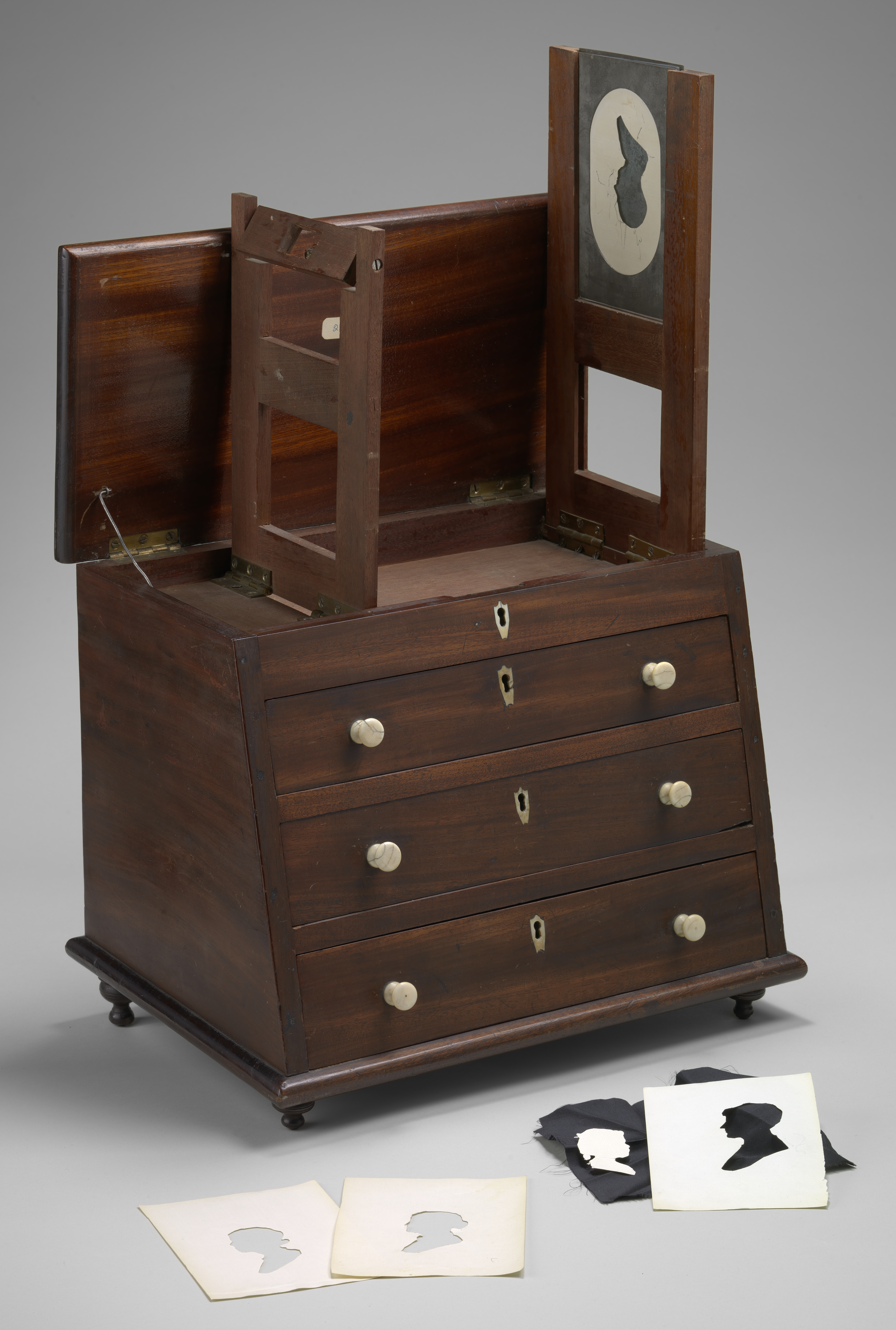
Raphaelle Peale's physiognotrace

By 1802, in response to the popularity of silhouettes, which were invented in the late eighteenth century, Peale introduced the British inventor John Hawkins's (1772–1855) physiognotrace at his museum in Philadelphia. While the operator traced the sitter’s head, the mechanism impressed the image onto a piece of paper that was often folded to produce multiple portraits. The operator then cut away the center of the paper, leaving a “hollow cut” image. These silhouettes, or profiles as they were also called, could be kept loose, framed, or compiled in albums; a black or blue piece of paper or fabric placed behind the image provided contrast.

Peale sent the watercolor sketch of the instrument to Thomas Jefferson, along with a detailed explanation. The drawing is now in the Jefferson Papers in the Library of Congress. In April 1805, Peale wrote his friend Dr. William Thornton to request a certified copy of a patent of a physiognotrace that was issued to Hawkins. Peale, who had an interest in the instrument and kept the original in his Philadelphia Museum, "needed the certified copy to bring suit against a person who was making the device without authority. John J. Hawkins had been in England, where he sold patent rights to the polygraph (duplicating device) and drawing machine for 1,600 guineas. Mr. Peale also wrote to Dr. Thornton in May 1805 to record an assignment of the Hawkins invention to Mr. Peale for the City of Philadelphia."

James Sharples, an itinerant British portrait artist who also lived for a time in Philadelphia, used a physiognotrace to draw profiles of such famous subjects as George Washington and Dolley and James Madison. Charles Balthazar Julien Févret de Saint-Mémin lived in the United States from 1793 to 1814. He created numerous portraits, often using the physiognotrace technique.

William Bache, another British artist traveling through the eastern United States and Cuba, patented his own version of the physiognotrace in 1803, with his partners Augustus Day and Isaac Todd. Bache produced thousands of silhouette portraits using a physiognotrace between 1803 and 1812. The Smithsonian's National Portrait Gallery acquired an album of his work in 2002 but conservators discovered the pages were infused with arsenic, which made it poisonous to touch. In March 2023, the almost 2000 silhouette images in Bache's album were made available digitally.
