= Morel (vaudevillist) =

Morel (before 1783 – 1802), was a French 18th–19th-century playwright and writer of Comédie en vaudevilles. His first name has always been unknown.

Morel's short career may suggest that he was the pseudonym of a more famous author unidentified to date. Joseph-Marie Quérard in his 1834 book La France Littéraire writes "MOREL ( ), died in 1802, aged 19" with no further information and Léon Thiessé in his Essai biographique et littéraire "We have named Morel, who died in 1802 aged twenty-one from a chest disease, who left some nice songs, and a political work almost unknown".

== Works ==
- 1799: Le Café des artistes, one-act Comédie en vaudeville, with Charles-Guillaume Étienne and Charles Gaugiran-Nanteuil
- 1799: L'intérieur d'un comité révolutionnaire, ou les jacobins, par moi
- 1799: Les Dieux à Tivoli, ou l'Ascension de l'Olympe, folie non fastueuse, arlequinade, impromptu in 1 act and vaudevilles, with Charles-Guillaume Étienne, Francis baron d'Allarde and Joseph Servières
- 1799: Rembrandt, ou la Vente après décès, vaudeville anecdotique en 1 acte, with Étienne and Servières
- 1800: Jacasset, ou la Contrainte par corps, comedy in 1 act and in prose, with Philibert
- 1801: Colombine toute seule, scène-parade, mingled with comédies en vaudeville, with Joseph Marty and Philibert
- 1801: Quel est le plus ridicule ? ou La Gravure en action, one-act folie-vaudeville, with Étienne Crétu with Étienne Gosse
