= Gilles-Louis Chrétien =

French cellist and engraver

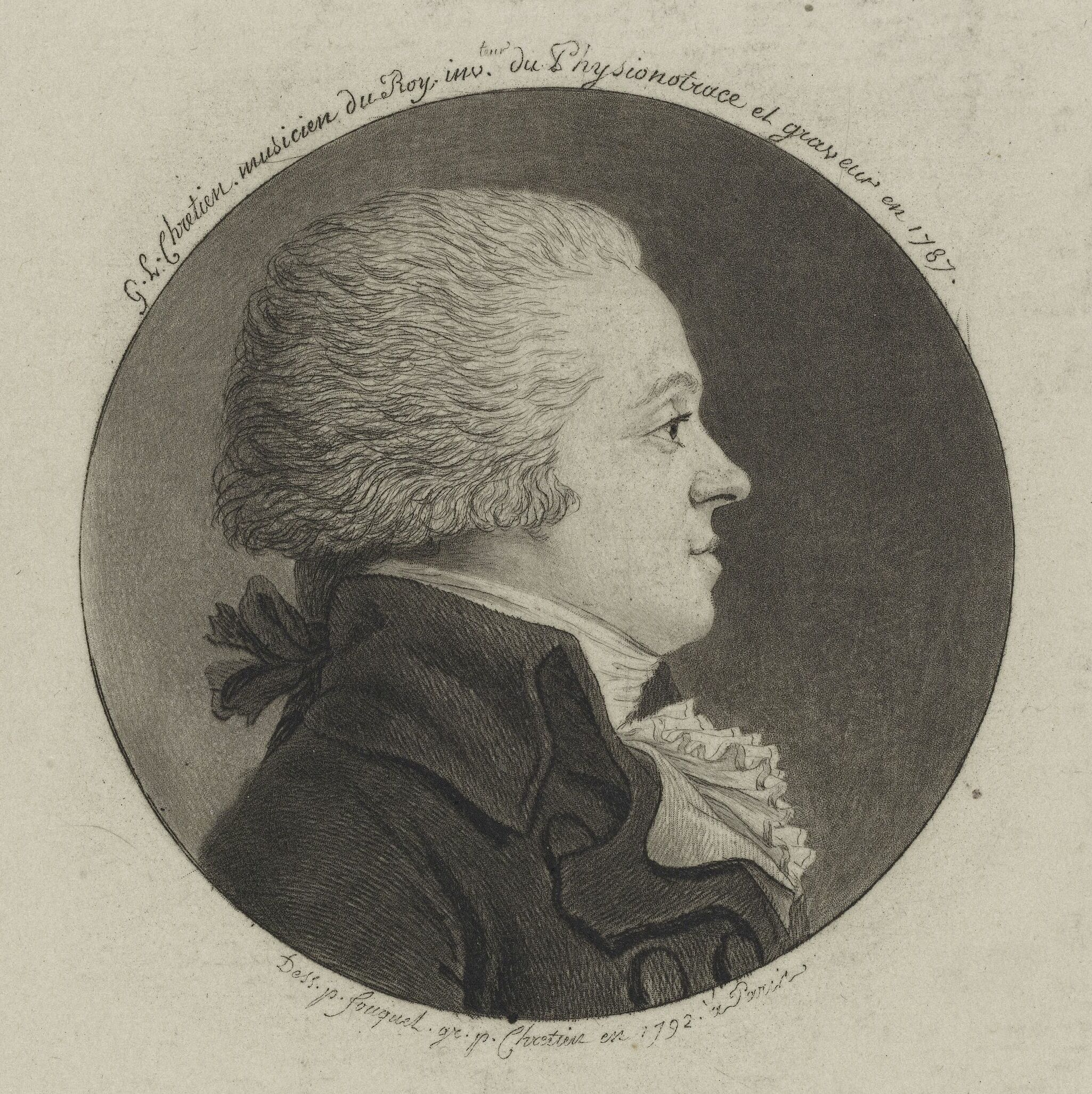
Physionotrace portrait of Gilles-Louis Chrétien, 1792

Gilles-Louis Chrétien (5 February 1754 – 4 March 1811) was a French cellist and engraver.

Chrétien was born at Versailles. In 1787 he invented a machine called a "physionotrace", with which he took portraits in profile from life. He worked initially with Edmé Quenedey, but then went into partnership with the miniaturist Jean-Baptiste Fouquet, until the latter's death in or about 1799. Fouquet produced the grand trait drawing, sometimes highlighted or coloured in pastel, which Chrétien then engraved in aquatint. Many of these portraits are of great interest on account of the celebrity of the persons represented, for example "L'Incorruptible" Robespierre, Mirabeau, and Marat, who were among the hundreds which he produced. Also, Dutch patriots, such as Johan Valckenaer, Samuel Iperusz Wiselius and Quint Ondaatje, who fled to France or visited Paris, ordered sets of physionotraces. Chrétien died in Paris in 1811.
