= James Sharples (portrait painter) =

English portrait painter (1751–1811)

- Born: James Sharples; 1751 or 1752; Lancashire, Kingdom of Great Britain
- Died: 1811; New York City, U.S.
- Known for: Painting, Pastelist
- Movement: Portrait, Silhouette

James Sharples (1751 or 1752 – 26 February 1811) was an English portrait painter and pastelist, who moved to the United States in 1794. He first exhibited at the Royal Academy in 1779.

== Biography ==
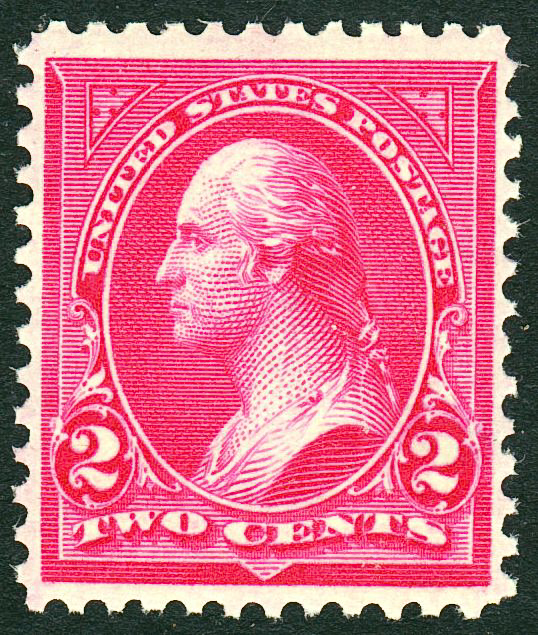
George Washington depicted on a postage stamp in 1895, based on an engraving taken from Sharples' 1741 portrait

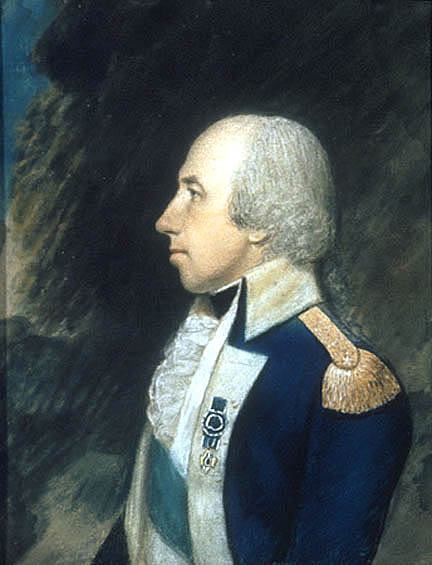
A portrait of Rufus Putnam painted in 1796 and 1777 and now in the collection of Independence National Historical Park in Philadelphia

Sharples first intended to enter the Catholic priesthood, but became an artist instead. Sharples headed a family of successful portrait artists, including his third wife Ellen Sharples. He had four children: George by his first wife; Felix Thomas Sharples from his second marriage (c. 1786- after 1823); and James Sharples Jr.(c. 1788–1839) and daughter Rolinda Sharples (1793–1838) with this third wife, Ellen. Felix, James Jr. and Rolinda joined the family enterprise at ages 17, 15, and 13 respectively.

Before marrying Ellen Wallace, James had been active in Bristol, Liverpool, and Bath, where he taught drawing. The family left for the United States in 1796, but, according to Ellen's diaries, their ship fell into the hands of the French, and for seven months the family spent time in Brest, near Cherbourg. Landing in New York, James quickly became popular for his small portraits in pastel and his miniatures. From 1796 to 1801 he worked mainly in Philadelphia and New York, securing portrait commissions. The family traveled throughout New England region as itinerant portrait painters, looking for work and making inexpensive copies from the originals portraits they had made of popular and well-known figures, such as George Washington and James Madison.

The Sharples family built both a reputation for accurate portraits and a modest fortune. As a viable alternative to the larger, formal oil portraits of Gilbert Stuart and Jonathan Trumbull, for example, their small-scale pastels made a major contribution to the growing Federal portrait industry.

After encountering problems with the lease of their house in Bath in 1801, the Sharples returned to England. The war between France and Britain delayed the family's return to the United States. Felix and James returned in 1806, and their parents and sister Rolinda followed in 1809. After James Sharples's death of heart trouble during an extremely cold winter in 1811, the family returned to England. Only Felix elected to remain behind.

== Personal papers ==
Letters, legal papers, bank and account books relating to James and Ellen Sharples and their family are held at Bristol Archives (Ref. 15395) (online catalogue).

== Paintings ==
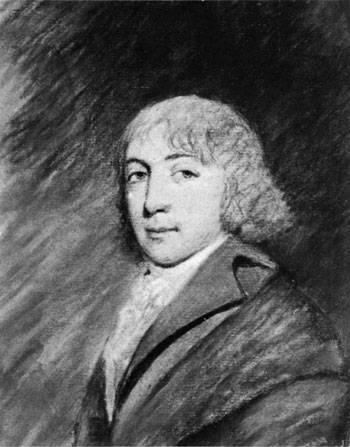
Carlos Martínez de Irujo y Tacón, Pastel attributed to James Sharples, Sr.

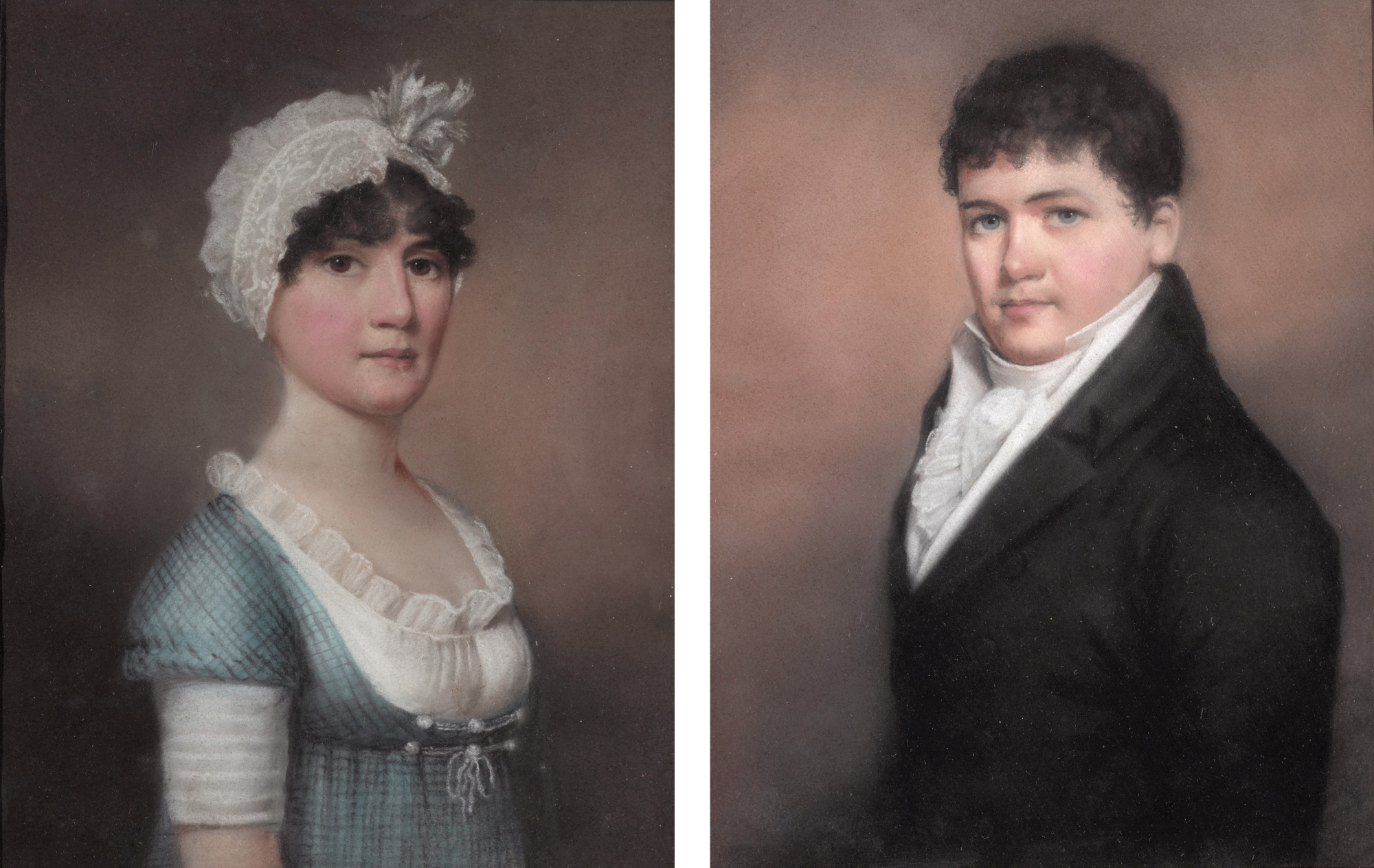
Portraits of a man and a woman, by James Sharples

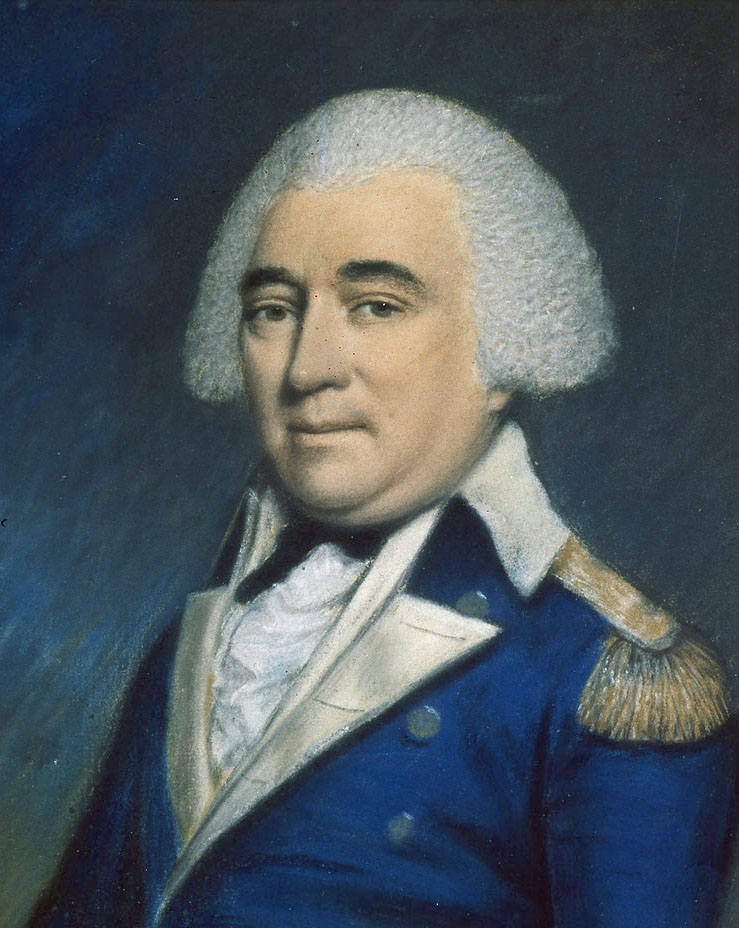
"Mad" Anthony Wayne, commander of the Legion of the United States by Sharples

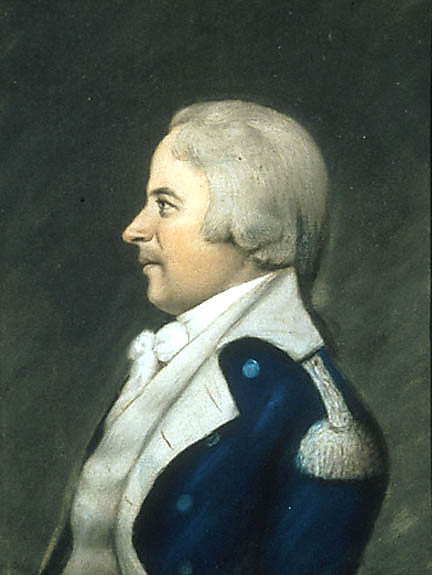
William Hull by Sharples about 1800

James Sharples established his career in America in 1794 by offering to make profiles of local and national politicians. He then used the original portraits to show as samples to new clients or to make copies of the originals. During this time, copies of portraits of famous people were popular, though the competition among artists was intense, and many had to travel in order to find customers. Sharples often used a physiognotrace, a mechanical drawing aid, to record an exact profile, which he kept for his personal collection. He would then copy these originals for resale. He also painted three-quarter bust-size pastel portraits with a delicate, precise touch. His color palette was predominantly black, white, and grey. The skin was rendered in flesh tones and the backgrounds were generally blue. "The mainstay of Sharples's business was making replicas from the life portrait he made of Washington, just as Gilbert Stuart's staple was making replicas in oil of his portrait of the first president." The Sharples charged $15 per profile and $25 for a full-face view.

Sharple's subjects included George Washington, Thomas Jefferson, Hester Thrale, Joseph Priestley, James Madison, Dolley Madison, John Adams, and Elihu Hubbard Smith. Sharples' family members all took part in duplicating the original portraits, which sometimes made it hard to distinguish the original from the duplicate.

According to the Re-identification of a Portrait by James Sharples, author David Meschutt re-identified the portrait labeled as General James Wilkinson in the Independence National Historical Park. Meschutt assessed that the unidentified figure in the portrait represents a soldier. Based on this information, Meschutt was able to narrow down the potential names of the figure with a Sharples collection catalogue. At the beginning of the process of comparing the portrait to the catalogue, Meschutt identified the figure as General William Hull. The identification process is reaffirmed by similarity between the first portraiture and the portraiture of General Hull in Worcester Art Museum. Further, John C. Milley proved the identity of the portraiture through a tracing of photography from the Independence painting.

From the listing in a book of The Royal Academy Exhibitors one can see that James Sharples exhibited his works before he moved to America. The following is a partial listing of his paintings.

- 1779 – Two paintings: A lady; Two gentlemen
- 1782 – Portrait of a lady of quality; nobleman; crayons (Duke of Northumberland, Walpole)
- 1783 – Portrait of a lady; a gentleman; a lady; fruit girl in the wind
- 1785 – A Newcastle lady in the character of Spring; portrait of a young lady; gentleman; lady

== Bibliography ==
- L. H. Cust, ‘Sharples, James (1751/2–1811)’, rev. Annette Peach, Oxford Dictionary of National Biography, Oxford University Press, 2004 http://www.oxforddnb.com/view/article/25240, accessed 11 June 2007
- Metz, Kathryn. "Ellen and Rolinda Sharples: Mother and Daughter Painters", Woman's Art Journal, Vol. 16, No. 1 (Spring – Summer, 1995), pp 3–11.
- The Sharples Family and Legal Papers: 1794 – 1854, Dr. Diane Waggoner
- Memorials of Washington and of Mary, his mother, and Martha, his wife, from letters and papers of Robert Cary and James Sharples, Scribners and Sons, 1887

== Links to Paintings ==
- George Washington Portrait, Virginia Historical Society
- Albert Gallatin, Metropolitan Museum
- Mrs. Horace Johnson, The AMICA Library
- Portrait of Nelly Custis, Mount Vernon
- Art Encyclopedia
