= Étienne Gosse =

French playwright and journalist (1773–1834)

Étienne Gosse (Bordeaux, 1773 – Toulon, 21 February 1834) was an 18th–19th-century French playwright, chansonnier, and journalist.

== Short biography ==
In 1793 he volunteered in the army and quickly became an officer and secretary at the arsenal in Nantes. Wounded during the war in the Vendée in 1796, he retired from service.

A proponent of liberal ideas in le Miroir and la Pandore, his plays were presented on the most important Parisian stages of his time including the Théâtre de la Gaîté, the Théâtre Français, and the Théâtre des Variétés.

He died from a stroke of apoplexy in Toulon 21 February 1834.

== Works ==
- 1794: La Mort de Vincent Malignon, trait historique, in 1 act
- 1798: L'Épreuve par ressemblance, one-act comedy, in verse
- 1799: L'Auteur dans son ménage, one-act comedy, in prose, mingled with ariettes
- 1799: L'Épicière bel-esprit, one-act comedy, in prose, with François Bernard-Valville
- 1799: Les Femmes politiques, three-act comedy in verse
- 1799: Pygmalion à Saint-Maur, farce-anecdotique in 1 act and vaudevilles, with Bernard-Valville and Étienne Crétu
- 1800: Le Nouveau débarqué, one-act comedy, mingled with vaudevilles
- 1801: Pont-de-Veyle, ou le Bonnet de docteur, one-act vaudeville
- 1801: Quel est le plus ridicule ? ou La Gravure en action, one-act folie-vaudeville, with Crétu and Morel
- 1802: Les Amants vendéens, 4 vols.
- 1810: Couplets du Roman, music by Charles-Henri Plantade, arrangement for voice and piano by Narcisse Carbonel
- 1814: Récit de la captivité et de la délivrance de M. l'abbé Desmazure
- 1816: Le Médisant, three-act comedy
- 1818: Fables, 1818
- 1819: Proverbes dramatiques, 2 vols.
- 1820: Manon Lescaut ou Le Chevalier des Grieux, three-act melodrama
- 1820: Le Flatteur, five-act comedy in verse
- 1825: Cours de littérature dramatique ou Recueil par ordre de matières des feuilletons de Geoffroy, précédé d'une notice historique sur sa vie et ses ouvrages, 6 vols.
- 1827: Les Jésuites, ou les autres Tartuffes, five-act comedy in verse
- 1828–1829: Histoire des bêtes parlantes, depuis 89 jusqu'à 124, par un chien de berger, 2 vols.
- 1830: De l'Abolition des privilèges et de l'émancipation des théâtres, with François-Joseph Fétis
- 1831: Quatre millions à retrancher du budget de 1831
- undated: Les Intrigants démasqués, ou le Souper de Forget aux Saintes-Claires, avec des notes instructives
- undated: Les Émigrés à l'île d'Yeu, divertissement en un acte en vaudevilles et en prose

== Bibliography ==
- Émile Lefranc, Histoire élémentaire et critique de la littérature, 1841, (p. 328–329)
- François-Xavier de Feller, Biographie universelle, vol.8, 1844, (p. 343) (Read online)
- Joseph-Marie Quérard, Charles Louandre, La littérature française contemporaine: XIXe siècle, 1852, (p. 130)
- Charles Dezobry, Théodore Bachelet, Dictionnaire général de biographie et d'histoire, 1866, (p. 1209)
- Pierre Larousse, Grand Larousse encyclopédique, vol.5, 1960, (p. 542)
