= Le trompeur trompé =

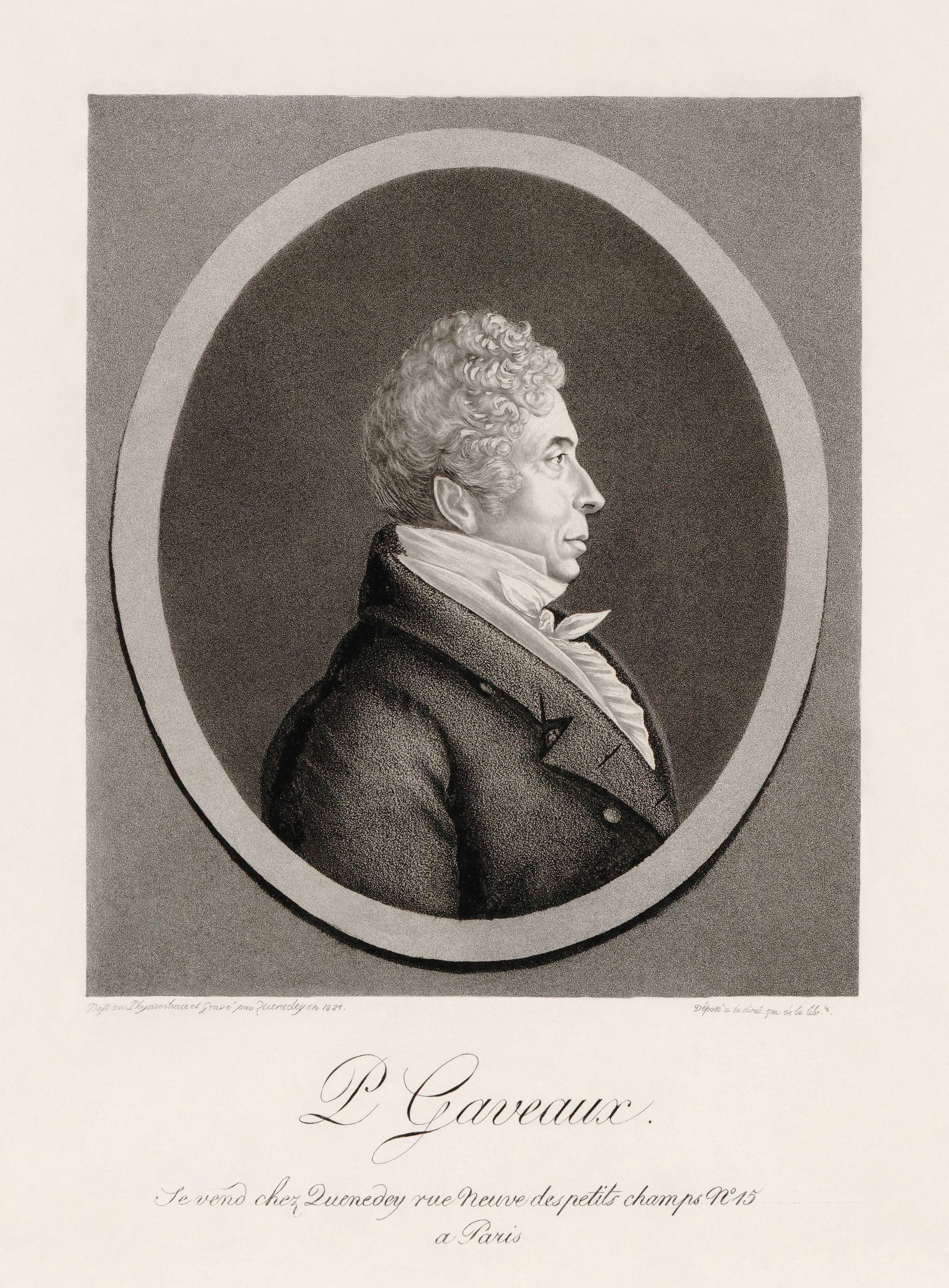
The opera's composer, Pierre Gaveaux, in 1821.

Le trompeur trompé (The Trickster Tricked) is a one-act opéra comique by Pierre Gaveaux, to a libretto by François Bernard-Valville. It premiered at the Théâtre Feydeau on 2 August 1800 (The first-edition libretto gives the date as 14 Thermidor an VIII, using the French Republican Calendar created during the French Revolution).

== Roles ==
| Role | Voice type | Premiere cast, 2 August 1800 (Conductor: ) |
|---|---|---|
| Jocard, an aged prosecuting attorney | | Citizen Juliet |
| Simonen, a merchant | | Citizen Résicourt |
| Beaupré, a ship-owner | | Citizen Georget |
| Duval, a midshipman (technically "aspirant de la marine") in the French Navy, and nephew of Beaupré | | Citizen Fay |
| A notary | | Citizen Prévost |
| Agathe, daughter of Simonen and Jocard's pupil | soprano | Mlle. Lesage |

== Synopsis ==
The play opens in the study of Jocard, a prosecuting attorney. Duval, his clerk, is working at his desk, musing over the circumstances that brought him to this role: He is really a midshipman, but has taken on the role of clerk due to his love for Agathe, Jocard's pupil. ("D'un mensonge très-innocent") Jocard's wife has recently died, and Jocard is now taking an interest in Agathe himself. She cannot be forced to marry him, but should Jocard find out about Duval's scheme, trouble would arise. Agathe thinks she should leave, but she and Duval promise to be faithful to each other. ("Il faut, il faut, que je vous quitte")

Jocard is heard approaching as they finish their farewells, and Agathe fails to escape in time. He asks why she was there, she tells him she was looking for him – which gives Jocard quite the wrong idea. Quickly refocusing, she says she came to tell him about some business with a proprietor of a hotel. Jocard knows of it, and she quickly loses his interest. However, all is not well: Jocard, pleased with Duval's work hitherto, sends him off to handle a case... for his uncle, who is not aware of Duval's impersonation. The scene ends with Duval, shaken, asking Agathe if it is necessary for him to return, only for Jocard to overhear him, and, misconstruing him, cheerily tell him that yes, he will be needed afterwards.

[...]

== List of arias ==
"Dieu du bonheur, Dieu plein du charmes..." (Agathe)
Polacca, sung by Montserrat Alavedra, performed on historical instruments

1. D'un mensonge très-innocent (A most innocent lie) – Duval
2. Il faut, il faut, que je vous quitte (It is necessary that I leave) – Agathe and Duval
3. Ces beaux galans, ces jeunes gens (These beautiful gallants, these young people) – Jocard
4. Vous qui souffrez du mal d'amour (You who suffer the evil of love) – Agathe
5. Buvons, buvons, à mes amours (Let us drink, drink with our beloved ones) – Jocard and Beaupré
6. Dieu du bonheur, Dieu plein du charmes (God of happiness, God full of charm) – Agathe
7. J'attendois, dans l'impatience (I wait, impatiently) – Agathe
8. Viens dans mes bras... oh! viens, ma chère (Come into my arms, Oh! Come, my beloved!) – Simonin, Agathe and Jocard
9. Finale: Venez, le monsieur de prétendu (Come, Mr. Make-believe) – Simonin, Jocard, the notary, Beaupré, Agathe and Duval
