= Étienne Crétu =

French playwright

Étienne Crétu was an 18th and 19th-century French playwright.

The son of Anthelme Crétu, managing director of the Théâtre des Variétés who associated him to the direction, his plays were presented in this theatre from 1801 to 1828.

== Works ==
- 1785: Les Deux gendres, comedy in five acts and in verse
- 1799: Pygmalion à Saint-Maur, farce-anecdotique in one act and vaudevilles, with François Bernard-Valville and Étienne Gosse
- 1801: Quel est le plus ridicule ? ou La Gravure en action, folie-vaudeville in 1 act, with Gosse and Morel
- 1826: Le Chiffonnier, ou le Philosophe nocturne, comédie en vaudevilles in five acts and in one day, with Emmanuel Théaulon
- 1826: Paris et Bruxelles, ou le Chemin à la mode, two-act comédie en vaudevilles, with Jean-Baptiste Gondelier and Théaulon
- 1826: Le Soufflet conjugal, one-act comédie en vaudevilles, with Théaulon
- 1827: Les Compagnons du devoir, ou le Tour de France, one-act tableau-vaudeville, with W. Lafontaine
- 1827: Le Bénéficiaire, comedy in five acts and one vaudeville, with Théaulon
- 1827: Jean de Calais, comedy in two acts, mingled with couplets, with Gabriel de Lurieu and Louis-Émile Vanderburch
- 1828: L'Oncle en tutelle, one-act comédie en vaudevilles, with Vanderburch
