= Étienne Aignan =

French translator, political writer, librettist and playwright (1773–1824)

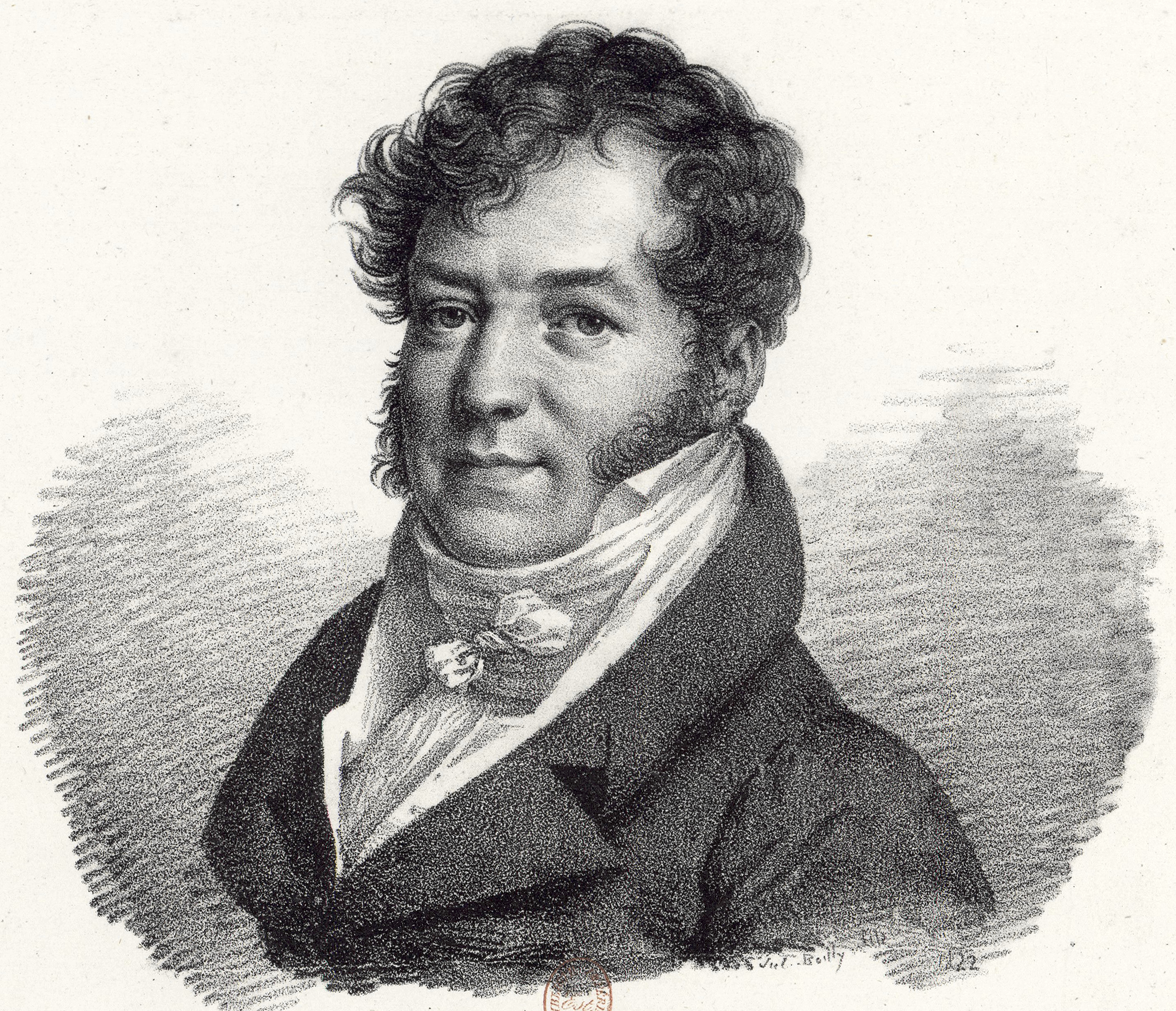
- Born: 9 April 1773; Beaugency
- Died: 21 June 1824 (aged 51); Paris
- Occupations: translator, political writer, librettist and playwright

Étienne Aignan (9 April 1773, Beaugency – 21 June 1824, Paris) was a French translator, political writer, librettist and playwright. In 1814 he was made a member of the Académie française, succeeding Bernardin de Saint-Pierre in Seat 27. He died on 21 June 1824 aged 51 years old.

== Main works ==
- 1793: Le Martyre de Marie-Antoinette d'Autriche, reine de France, five-act tragedy
- 1793: La Mort de Louis XVI, three-act tragedy.
- 1795: Aux Mânes des neuf victimes d'Orléans. Chants funèbres exécutés pour la première fois sur le théâtre d'Orléans, le 29 prairial, an IIIe. de la République française, et suivis de notes historiques: libretto/text, set in music by Brochiez for soloist singers, choir and orchestra (with narrator). (in memoriam the nine national guards from Orléans guillotined under the reign of Terror following the Léonard Bourdon case.)
- 1798: L'Hôtellerie portugaise, opéra comique, Paris, Théâtre Feydeau, 7 thermidor an VI
- 1801: Essai sur la critique, poëme en trois chants, suivi de deux discours philosophiques, traduction en vers libres de l'anglais de Pope.
- 1803: Le Ministre de Wakefield, by Oliver Goldsmith, new translation.
- 1803: Chimère et réalité, opéra comique in 1 act and in verse, Paris, Théâtre Feydeau, 17 nivôse an XI.
- 1804: Le Connétable de Clisson, three-act opera, Paris, Opéra, 20 pluviôse an XII.
- 1804: Polyxène, tragedy in three acts and in verse, Paris, Théâtre-Français, 23 nivôse an XII.
- 1806: Nephtali ou les Ammonites, three-act opera.
- 1809: L'Iliade, traduite en vers français, suivie de la comparaison des divers passages de ce poëme avec les morceaux correspondants des principaux poètes hébreux, grecs, français, allemands, italiens, anglais, espagnols et portugais, 3 vol.
- 1810: Brunehaut, ou les Successeurs de Clovis I, tragédie en 5 actes et en vers, Paris, Théâtre-Français, 24 February.
- 1817: De la justice et de la police, ou Examen de quelques parties de l'instruction criminelle considérées dans leur rapport avec les mœurs et la sûreté des citoyens.
- 1818: De l'État des protestants en France depuis le XVIe jusqu'à nos jours, avec des notes et éclaircissements historiques (1818).
- 1819: Des Coups d'État dans la monarchie constitutionnelle.
- 1822: Histoire du jury.
- 1823–1828: Bibliothèque étrangère d'histoire et de littérature ancienne et moderne, ou Choix d'ouvrages remarquables et curieux, traduits ou extraits de diverses langues, avec des notices et des remarques (3 vol.).
- 1825: Extraits des Mémoires relatifs à l'histoire de France depuis 1757.

== Sources ==
- J. Debarbouiller, « Aignan (Étienne) », in Charles Brainne (dir.), Les Hommes illustres de l'Orléanais: biographie générale des trois départements du Loiret, de l'Eure-et-Loir et de Loir-et-Cher, A. Gatineau, 1852, p. 259-261.
- « Notice sur M. Aignan », in Pierre Marie Michel Lepeintre Desroches, Suite du Répertoire du Théâtre-Français, with a selection of plays from several other theatres, arranged and classified, Chez Mme veuve Dabo, 1822, tome 7, p. 178-179.
- Gustave Vapereau, Dictionnaire universel des littératures, Paris, Hachette, 1876, p. 40.
