= Lodoïska (Cherubini) =

Opéra by Luigi Cherubini

- Opéra comique by Luigi Cherubini
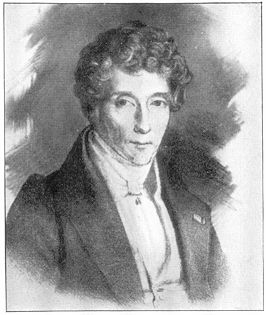
- Luigi Cherubini
- Librettist: Claude-François Fillette-Loraux
- Language: French
- Based on: Jean-Baptiste Louvet de Couvrai's Les amours du chevalier de Faublas
- Premiere: 18 July 1791; Théâtre Feydeau, Paris

Lodoïska is an opera by Luigi Cherubini to a French libretto by Claude-François Fillette-Loraux after an episode from Jean-Baptiste Louvet de Couvrai's novel, Les amours du chevalier de Faublas. It takes the form of a comédie héroïque (a type of opéra comique) in three acts, and was a founding work of rescue opera. It has also been called one of the first Romantic operas, though Cherubini's work was basically classical.

Stephen Willis has explained the importance of the work:

"With Lodoïska Cherubini turned his back on his training as an Italian composer of opera seria, choosing the freer form of opéra comique over the more stilted and confining tragédie lyrique and embarking on a course of development of opéra comique which was to lead to the eradication of almost all differences between the two genres, except for the spoken dialogue."

Basil Deane has called the opera "entirely original in its depth of psychological insight, dramatic tension, and musical depth."

== Performance history ==
It was first performed at the Théâtre Feydeau in Paris on 18 July 1791.

The opera was received enthusiastically and ran for 200 performances. It was so popular that it was revived again at the Feydeau in 1819 and was performed frequently in the Germanic countries in the early 19th century, including a production in Vienna in 1805, while Cherubini was there. John Philip Kemble produced an English version in 1794. It was first performed in New York on 4 December 1826.

== Roles ==
Role	Voice type	Premiere cast, 18 July 1791 (Conductor: — )
Count Floreski	tenor	Pierre Gaveaux
Lodoïska, Princess of Altanno	soprano	de Justal
Dourlinski	baritone	Châteaufort
Titzikan	tenor	Vallière
Altamoras	bass	Georget
Lysinka	soprano	Hédou-Verteuil
Varbel	baritone	Jean-Blaise Martin

== Synopsis ==
Place: Poland
Time: 1600

=== Act 1 ===
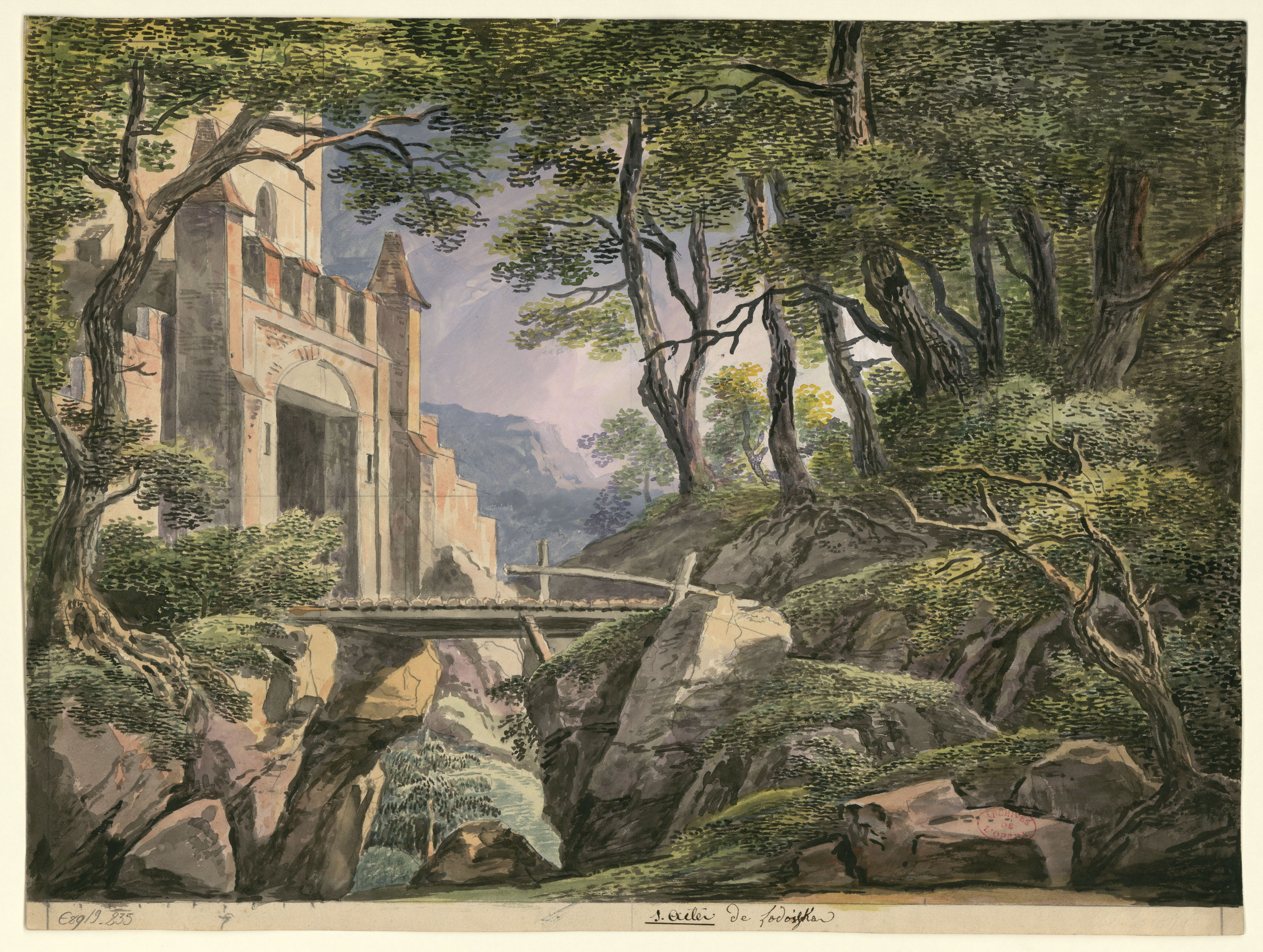
Sketch for the decor of the first act (1791), by Ignazio Degotti

A group of Tartar warriors, led by Titzikan, are approaching the castle of a notorious baron named Dourlinsky. One of Titzikan's men reports that Dourlinsky leaves the castle frequently, and that while he's gone the castle could be taken easily. But Titzikan says that a sneak attack would be underhanded — he wants to defeat Dourlinsky in a fair contest. They then hear someone approaching, and hide in the woods to observe.

The Polish count Floreski appears with his faithful attendant Varbel. Their horses have been stolen by the Tartars, so they're trudging along on foot. Floreski is hunting for his girlfriend, Lodoiska. The two had planned to be married. But Lodoiska's father had a political disagreement with Floreski. So he cancelled the wedding, denounced Floreski and hid Lodoiska in a secret location. Since then, her father has died and nobody knows exactly where she is.

Floreski and Varbel are confronted by Titzikan and one of his warriors. In a fight, the Tartars are disarmed. Titzikan is impressed by Floreski's honorable way of battle, and the two men form an alliance. Titzikan says he and his forces are planning to attack Baron Dourlinski, whose forces have ravaged their land — and he says that Dourlinski lives in the nearby castle.

Floreski remembers that Dourlinski was a friend of Lodoiska's father. Can this be where she's been hidden? A stone then lands at his feet, with a note attached. It was thrown by Lodoiska herself. She's being held in the castle's prison tower. When Floreski approaches the tower, she sings to him, saying that at midnight, he should climb to the top of the tower and lower a note to her window.

But the skittish Varbel has another idea. Dourlinsky doesn't know that Lodoiska's father has died. Varbel says they should go to the castle, deliver the news, and say they've been sent by Lodoiska's mother to bring her home. Floreski agrees. They knock on the castle door and a wary servant ushers them inside.

=== Act 2 ===
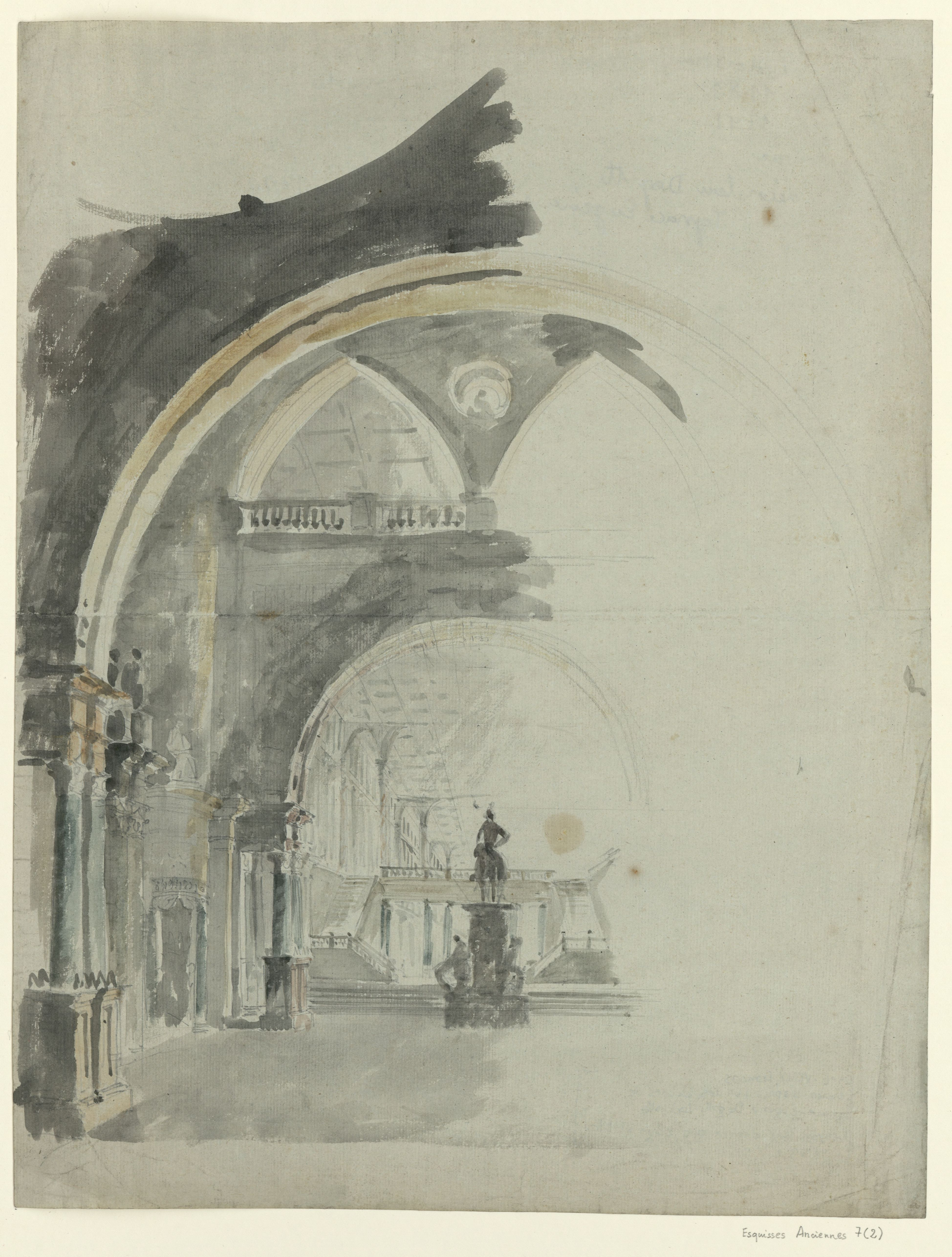
An antic gallery, sketch for the decor of the second act (1791) by François Verly, after Ignazio Degotti

Dourlinsky's henchman Altamoras has taken Lodoiska from the tower to a dark hall deep inside the castle, along with her nurse, Lysinka. Dourlinsky himself then enters and orders Lysinka out of the room. He wants to speak with Lodoiska privately. Dourlinsky has decided to marry Lodoiska. When she tells him he has no right to marry her, he replies that he has the rights of "a lover who has you in his power." She tells him he's a monster, not a lover, and that she's in love with someone else — Count Floreski.

There's a vehement confrontation and Dourlinsky orders his men to take her to the darkest, most secret part of the prison tower. He also vows to track down this Floreski, whoever he is, and get rid of him. With Lodoiska gone, Dourlinsky meets with Floreski and Varbel, not knowing who they are. When they tell him they've been sent to take Lodoiska back to her mother, Dourlinsky plainly doesn't believe it. He tells them to report back that Lodoiska is no longer with him. Knowing Dourlinsky is lying, Floreski hesitates, not sure what to do next. To buy some time, he says that he and Varbel would like to stay the night, to rest up before their journey home. Dourlinsky agrees, but tells Altamoras to keep an eye on them.

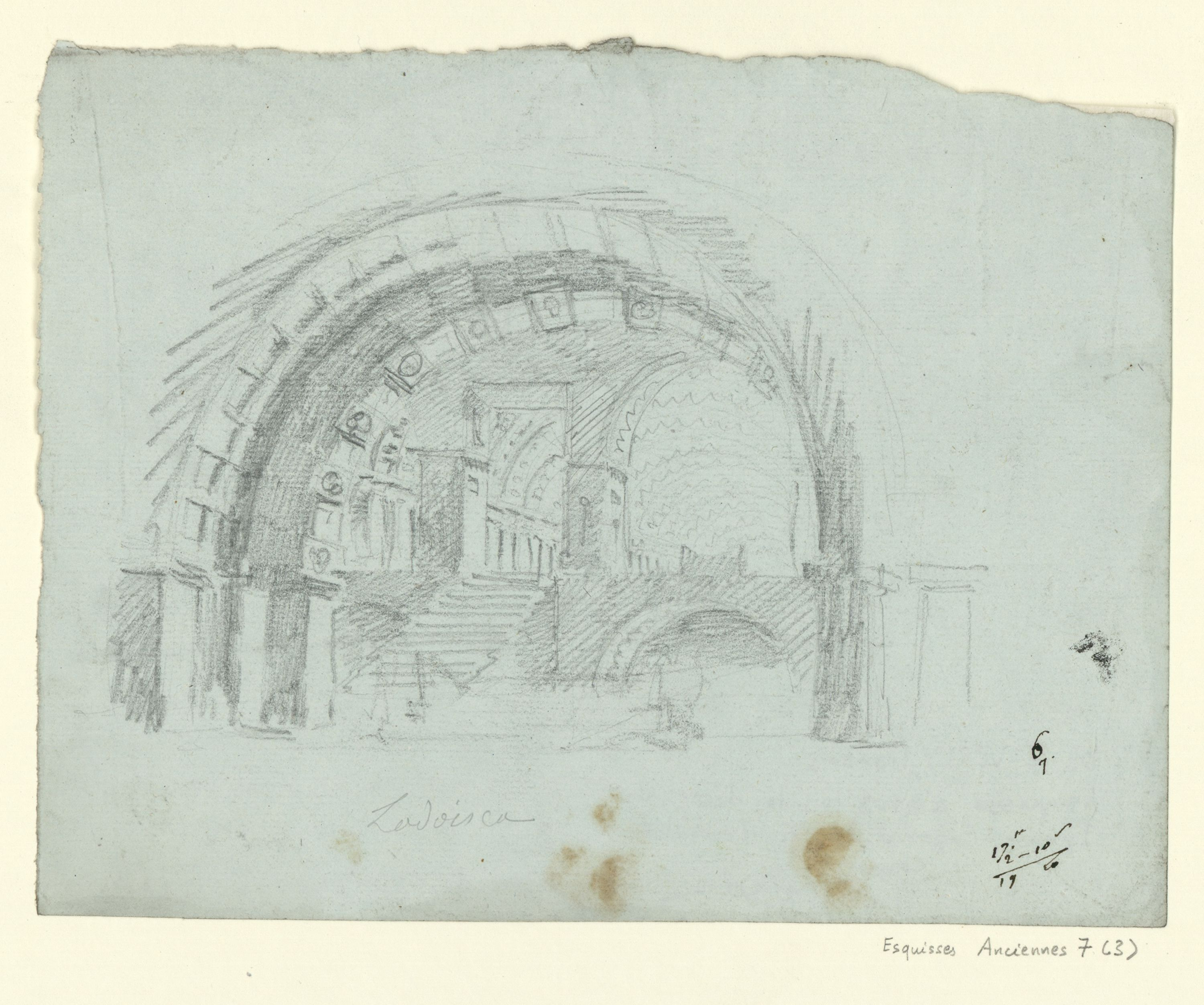
Sketch for the decor of the second act (1791) by François Verly, after Ignazio Degotti

Alone, Floreski is fuming. He realizes that Dourlinsky plans to steal Lodoiska for himself. Varbel then joins him with disturbing news: He's overheard a couple of Dourlinsky's men, who are planning to offer them some refreshments — two glasses of poisoned wine. When the men appear, Floreski stalls for time — and Varbel switches the wine they've been offered for the glasses Dourlinsky's men have brought for themselves. They all drink up, and the would-be poisoners are soon out cold. But when Floreski and Varbel try to escape, Dourlinsky confronts them with a group of soldiers. Floreski defiantly reveals his identity, and he and Varbel are taken prisoner.

=== Act 3 ===
Dourlinsky goes to Lodoiska with an ultimatum. If she refuses to marry him, Floreski will be killed. Not knowing what's happened back at home, Lodoiska pleads a technicality: She can't be married unless her father is there to give her away. Dourlinsky curtly tells her that her father is dead, and Lodoiska passes out from shock.

Floreski is then dragged in, and as Lodoiska regains consciousness, she runs to him. Dourlinsky repeats his demand: Either Lodoiska marries him, or Floreski dies. Lodoiska tells Dourlinsky that she'd rather be stabbed through the heart than marry him. Then she and Floreski vow to die together rather than give in. Dourlinsky had been sure that he was about to get what he wanted, and wonders what to do next. But it's a moot point when cannon fire is heard. Titzikan, Floreski's Tartar ally, is attacking the castle with his army.

In a spectacular scene that helped to make the opera a hit in Paris, one of the castle walls is blown up, then crumbles to reveal the battlefield outside. In fierce fighting, the Tartars overcome Dourlinsky's forces. While that goes on, Dourlinsky hides Lodoiska in the tower, but Titzikan rescues her just as the tower collapses. The resourceful Tartar also manages to save Floreski — snatching a dagger from Dourlinsky's hands in the nick of time. With his castle in flames around him, Dourlinsky admits defeat — while Floreski and Lodoiska celebrate their reunion.

== Recordings ==
- Conducted by Riccardo Muti live from the Teatro alla Scala 1991 (Sony Music CD 5099709312625)
- Łukasz Borowicz (Ludwig van Beethoven Association 2008, 5907812241858).
- Jérémie Rhorer (2010 recording by Le Cercle de l'Harmonie on Naïve AM 209)
