= Jacques-Antoine de Révéroni Saint-Cyr =

French playwright and soldier (1767–1829)

Jacques-Antoine Révéroni, baron de Saint-Cyr (5 May 1767, Lyon – 19 March 1829, Paris) was a French soldier and man of letters.

== Career ==
Révéroni de Saint-Cyr is remembered mostly for his novel, Pauliska, ou La Perversité moderne, mémoires récents d'une Polonaise (1798), first published by bibliophile Paul Lacroix in 1848, after the author's manuscript.

=== Theatre ===
- 1793: Le Club de sans-souci, ou les Deux Pupilles, comedy in one act and free verse mingled with vaudevilles, in-8°
- 1795: Helena, ou les Miquelets, opera in two acts, Paris, in-8°
- 1795: Élisa, ou le Voyage au mont Saint-Bernard, opera in two acts, in-8°
- 1797: L’Hospice de village, opera in two acts
- 1800: Le Délire, ou les Suites d’une erreur, one-act opéra comique, in-8°
- La Rencontre aux bains, one-act comédie en vaudeville
- 1804: Sophie Pierrefeu, ou le Désastre de Messine, historical fact in three acts, mingled with ariettes, in-8° (unplayed)
- 1805: Le Vaisseau amiral, ou Forbin et Delville, one-act opera, in-8°
- 1807: Lina ou le Mystère, drame lyrique in three acts and in prose, music by Nicolas Dalayrac, created at the Opéra-Comique (théâtre Feydeau), 8 October, in-8°
- 1810: Cagliostro, ou les Illuminés, opéra comique in three acts, in-8°
- 1811: Les Ménestrels, ou la Tour d’Amboise, opéra in three acts, in-8°
- 1816: Christine, reine de Suède, tragedy in three acts, in-8° (unplayed)
- 1816: Déjanire, ou la Mort d’Hercule, grand opéra in one act, in-8° (unplayed)
- 1816: Pline, ou l’Héroïsme des arts et de l’amitié, opera in one act, in-8° (unplayed)
- 1817: Mademoiselle de Lespinasse, comedy in one act and in verse, in-8° (unplayed)
- 1817: Les Partis, ou le Cornérage universel, comedy in three acts and in verse, in-8° (unplayed)
- 1817: Le Siège de Rhodes, opera in three acts, in-8° (unplayed).
- 1817: Le Sybarite, comedy in three acts and in verse, in-8° (unplayed)
- 1818: La Comtesse de la Marck, historical comedy in three acts, (with Armand d'Artois)
- 1827: Vauban à Charleroi, historical comedy in three acts and in verse, in-8° (with Vial)

(Many of these pieces were not presented; others were played in theaters Louvois, Favart, Montansier, Feydeau, de la Cité et de l’Odéon. In 1828, Révéroni de Saint-Cyr composed an opéra comique entitled les Grenouilles, imitated from Aristophanes, and he had chosen midnight to read it to the Feydeau theater committee. Having found no one, he got angry and knocked at the door of some actors. It was the beginning of an insanity which only got worse.)

== Novels ==
- 1797: Sabina d’Herfeld, ou les Dangers de l’imagination, Paris, two volumes, in-12; 4th edition, 1814, two volumes, in-12
- 1798: Pauliska, ou La Perversité moderne, mémoires récents d’une Polonaise, two volumes, in-12
- 1799: Nos Folies, ou Mémoires d’un Musulman connu à Paris, two volumes, in-12
- 1813: La Princesse de Nevers, ou Mémoires du sire de la Touraille, two volumes, in-12; 2nd edition. 1823, two volumes, in-12
- 1814: L’Officier russe à Paris, ou Aventures et réflexions critiques du comte de ***, two volumes, in-12
- 1818: Le Torrent des passions, ou les Dangers de la galanterie, two volumes, in-12
- 1822: Historiettes galantes et grivoises, suivies des Mœurs du jour, Fables politiques et critiques, in-12
- 1823: Le Prince Raymond de Bourbon, ou les Passions après les révolutions, suite de la Princesse de Nevers, two volumes, in-12
- 1825: Taméha, reine des îles Sandwich, two volumes, in-12

== Scientific books ==
- 1795: Inventions militaires et fortifiantes, ou Essais sur des moyens nouveaux offensifs et cachés dans la guerre défensive, Paris, in-8°, with four pl.; 2nd edition, under the title Inventions militaires dans la guerre défensive, 1798, in-12
- 1804: Essai sur le perfectionnement des beaux-arts par les sciences exactes, ou Calculs et hypothèses sur la poésie, la peinture et la musique, Paris, 1804, two volumes, in-8°, with four pl.
- 1808: Essai sur le mécanisme de la guerre, in-8°. This work, dedicated to Marshall Berthier, was selected for one of the prix décennaux in 1810. Encouraged by Carnot, the author reworked entirely his book and later gave another edition under the title Statique de la guerre, or Principes de stratégie et de tactique, followed by Mémoires militaires et inédits, et la plupart anecdotiques, relatifs à des généraux ou des événements célèbres, à Bonaparte, à Dumouriez, au plan de la défense des Tuileries, le 10 août, au 13 vendémiaire, etc., Paris, 1826, in-8°, with planches.
- 1820: Examen critique de l’équilibre social européen, ou Abrégé de statistique politique et littéraire, in-8°, with planche et tableaux

An undated Ode à S. M. l’empereur Alexandre is attributed to Révéroni de Saint-Cyr. Presque tous ses ouvrages ont paru sans nom d’auteur.

== Sources ==
- Louis-Gabriel Michaud, Biographie universelle, ancienne et moderne, Paris, (p. 1846)
