= Edmé Quenedey des Ricets =

French painter and engraver

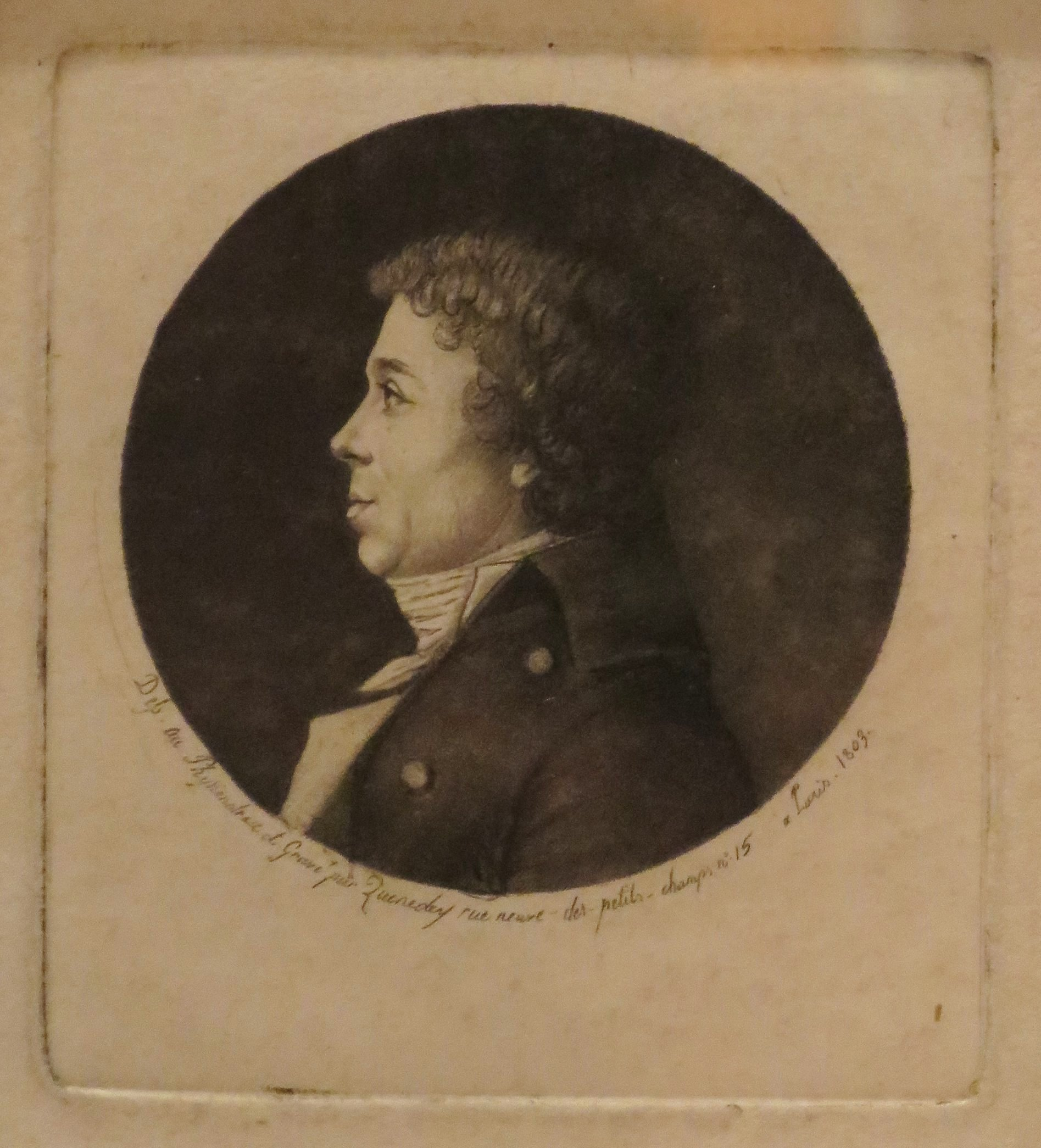
Self portrait by Edme Quenedey, 1803, physionotrace and aquatint, Honolulu Museum of Art

Edmé Quenedey des Ricets (sometimes Edmé Quenedey; December 17, 1756 – February 16, 1830) was a French painter and engraver, known most especially for his miniatures. He was born in Riceys-le-Haut. One of a family of eight children, he was initially destined for the priesthood, but studied instead at Dijon; he began his career as a restorer of pictures. Upon the invention of the physionotrace by Gilles-Louis Chrétien they cooperated for making portraits. In 1789 he began for himself. With his wife, Marie-Madeleine Pella, he had two children, Adèle and Aglaë; the latter later became an assistant to his father. He died in Paris.
