= Julie-Angélique Scio =

French soprano

Julie-Angélique Scio (1768 – 14 July 1807) was a leading French soprano. Born in Lille as Julie-Angélique Legrand, she married the composer Etienne Scio. She made her debut in Paris in 1792. She is most famous for creating roles in operas by Luigi Cherubini staged at the Théâtre Feydeau between 1794 and 1800, namely the title characters of Eliza and Médée and Constance in Les deux journées.

== Sources ==
- New Grove Dictionary of Music entry for Etienne Scio
