= Les deux journées =

- Opéra comique by Luigi Cherubini
- Costume design for the water carrier
- Librettist: Jean-Nicolas Bouilly
- Language: French
- Premiere: 16 January 1800; Théâtre Feydeau, Paris

Les deux journées, ou Le porteur d'eau (The Two Days, or The Water Carrier) is an opera in three acts by Luigi Cherubini with a libretto by Jean-Nicolas Bouilly. It takes the form of an opéra comique, meaning not that the subject matter is humorous, but that the piece is a mixture of spoken dialogue and musical numbers. Bouilly claimed he took the story from a real-life incident during the French Revolution but, for fear of censorship, he moved the action back to 1647 and the time of Cardinal Mazarin. The opera was first performed on 16 January 1800 at the Théâtre Feydeau in Paris.

Les deux journées is sometimes considered Cherubini's most successful opera, though revivals have been rare in the past hundred years. Johann Wolfgang von Goethe and Ludwig van Beethoven both felt that Bouilly's libretto was one of the best of its day; Beethoven kept Cherubini's score on his desk and copied out passages from it while composing Fidelio.

== Roles ==
Roles, voice types, premiere cast
Role	Voice type	Premiere cast, 16 January 1800
Mikeli	baritone	Marcel-Jean-Antoine Juliet
Armand	tenor	Pierre Gaveaux
Antonio	tenor	Jausserand
Constance	soprano	Angélique Scio-Legrand
Marcelina	soprano	Rosette Gavaudan (later to be known as Mme Gontier-Gavaudan)
Angelina	soprano	Desmares
Daniel, Mikeli's father	bass	Platel
Sémos, Angelina's father	bass	Ferdinand Prévost
First Italian commander	bass	Alexis Dessaules
Second Italian commander	bass	Georget
First Italian soldier	bass	Darcourt
Second Italian soldier	bass	Garnier
Chorus: soldiers and villagers

== Synopsis ==
Place: France
Time: 1647, at the time of Cardinal Mazarin

=== Act 1 ===
Mikeli's home

Mikeli is a Savoyard water carrier living in Paris. Mikeli's son, Antonio, tells how as a child his life was saved by an unknown Frenchman. He is interrupted when Count Armand, a member of the French parliament, enters with his wife, Constance, begging Mikeli to save him from Cardinal Mazarin's soldiers. Mikeli willingly offers his assistance. He tells Armand that Antonio is due to be married the next day to Angelina, who lives in Gonesse. He plans to smuggle Armand and Constance out of the city, which is ringed by Mazarin's men, by disguising Constance as Antonio's sister, Marcelina, and hiding Armand in his own water cart. Antonio enters and, to his delight, recognises Armand as the Frenchman who saved him as a child.

=== Act 2 ===
The gates of Paris

Mazarin's soldiers are stopping passersby in their search for political fugitives. After some delay, they let Antonio and his "sister" through, but they are suspicious of Mikeli's cart. While Mikeli distracts them, Armand slips out of the cart and through the gate. Mikéli is turned back.

=== Act 3 ===
In Gonesse

The villagers are preparing for Angelina and Antonio's wedding. A patrol of soldiers enter as Antonio, Armand and Constance arrive. Armand hides in a tree but gives himself up when they arrest his wife. At this point, Mikeli appears with news that the queen has offered a free pardon to all the members of parliament. All ends happily.

== Recordings ==
- 1947: Sir Thomas Beecham, BBC Theatre Chorus, Royal Philharmonic Orchestra, various reissues
- 2002: Christoph Spering, Chorus Musicus Köln, Das Neue Orchester, Opus 111
