= Pierre Gaveaux =

French operatic tenor and composer

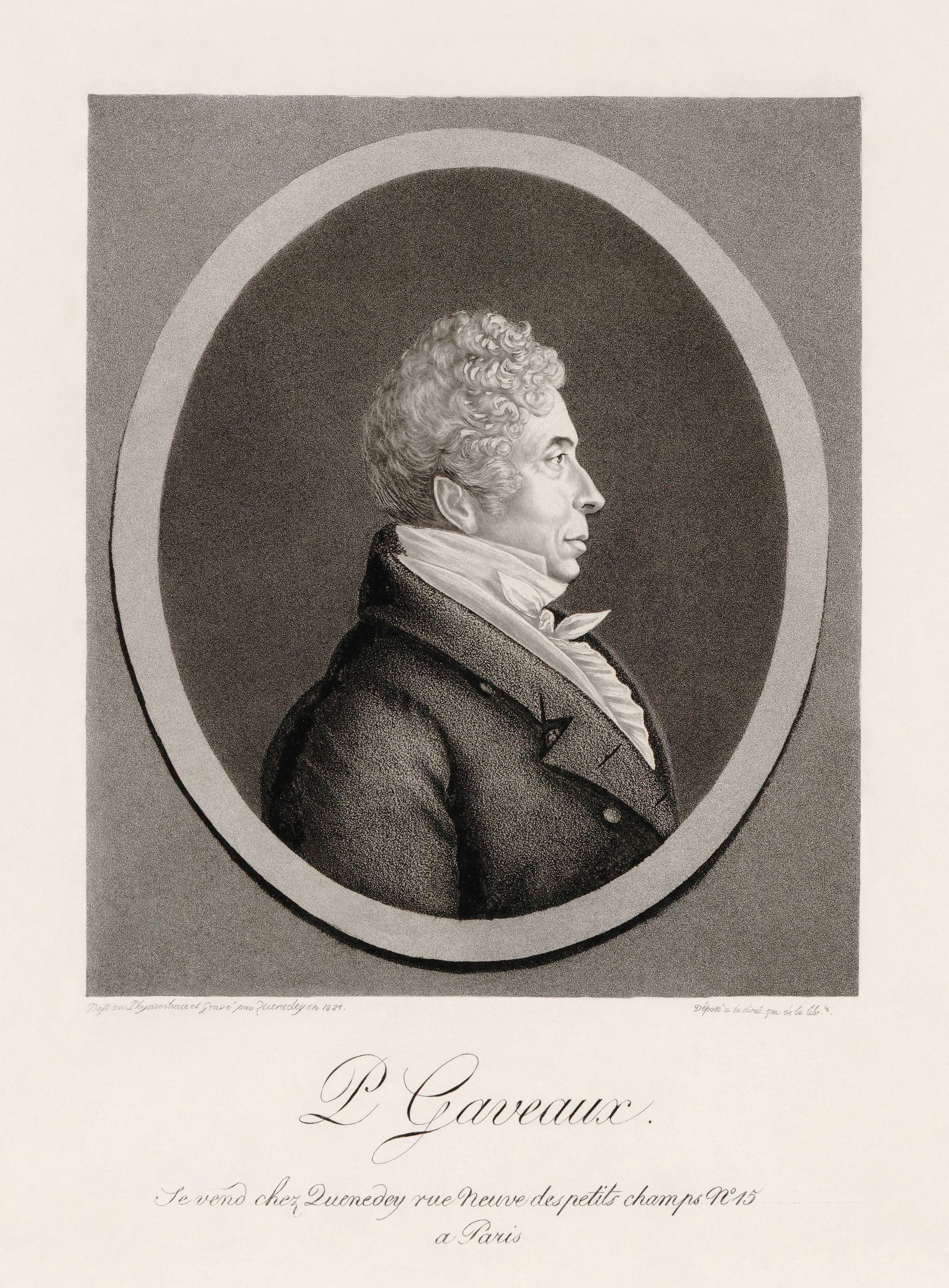
Pierre Gaveaux Portrait by Edmé Quenedey after a physionotrace (1821).

Pierre Gaveaux (6 October 1760 – 5 February 1825) was a French operatic tenor and composer, notable for creating the role of Jason in Cherubini's Médée and for composing Léonore, ou L'amour conjugal, the first operatic version of the story that later found fame as Fidelio.

== Early life ==
Gaveaux was born in Béziers and sang in the cathedral choir there from the age of seven. Although intending to enter the priesthood, he also took lessons in composition. He next became first tenor at the Basilica of Saint-Seurin in Bordeaux, studying with Franz Ignaz Beck, and subsequently decided to follow a career in music, becoming a conductor at the Grand Théâtre de Bordeaux as well as continuing to sing.

== Career as a singer ==
After a period in Montpellier, he moved to Paris where, on 26 January 1789, he took part in a performance of Giacomo Tritto's Le Avventure Amorose, which marked the inauguration of the Théâtre de Monsieur company in the Salle des Machines at the Tuileries Palace.

He subsequently performed with the company in operas such as Paisiello's L’Infante de Zamora (in 1789), and on 18 July 1791 he sang the role of Floresky in the première of Cherubini's Lodoïska. When the company moved to the Théâtre Feydeau, he was involved in a "folly in verse" called Le club des bonnes gens which was banned by the censor for being unpatriotic.

He was active during the revolutionary period, composing in 1792 a hymn to the Supreme Being. On 19 January 1795, his famous anti-Jacobin song Le Réveil du peuple (The Awakening of the People), to words by Jean-Marie Souriguière de Saint-Marc, was first performed. Notwithstanding the banning of the song on 8 January 1796 by the Directoire, he continued his career in opera, appearing in François Devienne's Les visitandines, and creating the role of Jason in Cherubini's Médée on 13 March 1797.

== Operas ==
Gaveaux's first opera, L'amour filial (1792), was a success in Paris and was performed throughout Europe: Brussels, Cologne and Rotterdam in 1795, Bern and Moscow in 1809, Berlin and Hamburg (in a German translation) in 1796.

His most famous opera, Léonore, ou L’amour conjugal, premièred in 1798, with Gaveaux himself in the role of Florestan and Julie-Angélique Scio as Léonore. It is best known today because the libretto (by Jean-Nicolas Bouilly) served as the basis for Beethoven's only opera, Fidelio. It was revived by Opera Lafayette (Season 2016-2017).

Other operas by Gaveaux that were popular in their day include Sophie et Moncars, Le bouffe et le tailleur and Monsieur Des Chalumeaux, and in 1808 he composed L'échelle de soie to a translation of the libretto which Giuseppe Maria Foppa had written for Rossini's La scala di seta.

=== Chronological list of operas ===
Polacca from Le Trompeur Trompé (1800)
From Le Trompeur Trompé. Montserrat Alvedra, soprano; William McColl, clarinet; Joseph Levine, fortepiano. Played on historical instruments.

- L'amour filial, 1792
- Le paria ou La chaumière indienne, 1792
- Les deux ermites, 1793
- La partie carrée, 1793
- La famille indigente, 1794
- Sophronime ou La reconnaissance, 1795
- Delmon et Nadine, 1795
- La gasconnade, 1795
- Le petit matelot ou Le mariage impromptu, 1796
- Lise et Colin ou La surveillance inutile, 1796
- Tout par hasard, 1796
- Céliane, 1796
- Le mannequin vivant ou Le mari de bois, 1796
- Le traité nul, 1797
- Sophie et Moncars ou L'intrigue portugaise, 1797
- Léonore, ou L'amour conjugal, 1798
- Le diable couleur de rose ou Le bonhomme misère, 1798
- Les noms supposés ou Les deux jockeys, 1798
- Le locataire, 1800
- Le trompeur trompé, 1800
- Ovinska ou Les exilés de Sibérie, 1801
- Le retour inattendu, 1802
- Un quart d'heure de silence, 1804
- Le bouffe et le tailleur, 1804
- Avis aux femmes ou Le mari colère, 1804
- Trop tôt ou Le projet manqué, 1804
- Le mariage inattendu, 1804
- Le diable en vacances ou La suite du diable couleur de rose, 1805
- L'amour à Cythère, 1805
- Monsieur Des Chalumeaux, 1806
- L'échelle de soie, 1808
- La rose blanche et la rose rouge, 1809
- L'enfant prodigue, 1811
- Pygmalion, 1816
- Une nuit au bois ou Le muet de circonstance, 1818

== Later life ==
Gaveaux continued to sing until 1812, although after the company of the Théâtre Feydeau merged with that of the Théâtre Favart in 1801, his voice was in decline and he only performed secondary roles. In 1819 he entered the asylum at Charenton on the outskirts of Paris, where he died. His wife, Émilie Gavaudan (also a singer), died in 1840.
