= Théâtre Feydeau =

Former theater company in Paris

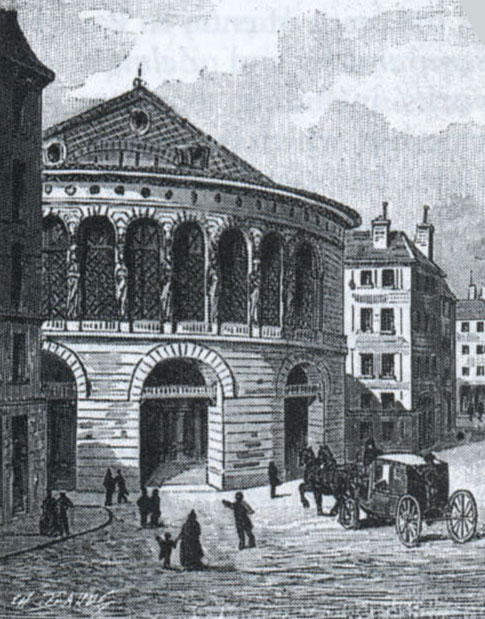
Salle Feydeau 48°52′11.43″N 2°20′24.20″E

The Théâtre Feydeau (pronounced [teɑtʁ fɛdo]), a former Parisian theatre company, was founded in 1789 with the patronage of Monsieur, Comte de Provence (later to become Louis XVIII), and was therefore initially named the Théâtre de Monsieur. It began performing in the Salle des Tuileries, located in the north wing of the Tuileries Palace, then moved to the Salle des Variétés at the Foire Saint-Germain, and beginning in 1791, settled into its own custom-built theatre, the Salle Feydeau located on the rue Feydeau. The company was renamed Feydeau after the royal family was arrested during the French Revolution.

The company first presented Italian opera by composers such as Giovanni Battista Pergolesi, Giuseppe Sarti, and Giovanni Paisiello and later French plays, vaudevilles, and opéras comiques, as well as symphonic concerts, and was especially famous for the quality of its orchestra and realistic stagings. The Italian Luigi Cherubini was the house composer, but the French composers Jean-François Le Sueur, François Devienne, and Pierre Gaveaux were also closely associated with the company.

In 1801 the Théâtre Feydeau merged with, and took the name of its chief rival, the Opéra-Comique. Except for a brief period from July 1804 to July 1805, when the merged company performed at the Salle Favart, it continued to perform at the Salle Feydeau until 1829, when it moved to a new theatre, the Salle Ventadour. The Salle Feydeau was demolished shortly thereafter.

== History ==
=== At the Tuileries ===
The company was founded on 26 January 1789 by Marie-Antoinette's coiffeur Léonard-Alexis Autier and the violinist and composer Giovanni Battista Viotti and at first used the Salle des Tuileries, which had previously been the Salle des Machines, but had been greatly modified and reduced in size by the architects Jacques-Germain Soufflot and Ange-Jacques Gabriel for the Paris Opera in 1763. Since the Théâtre de Monsieur was opened for the King's brother and was at the Tuileries Palace, the King allowed the performers to live at the palace. While most theatres of the time were only permitted to do one kind of drama, the Théâtre de Monsieur performed French drama, opéra comique, vaudeville, and Italian opera buffa.

=== At the Saint-Germain Fair ===
On 6 October 1789 Louis XVI and Marie-Antoinette moved to the Tuileries Palace after being forced to leave Versailles for Paris by rioters. It was decided that the Théâtre de Monsieur would have to find new quarters, and that a new theatre would be built, but in the interim, the company would perform in the Salle des Variétés at the Saint-Germain Fair. The company's last performance at the Tuileries was on 23 December, and it opened at the Salle des Variétés on 10 January 1790.

Piccini's La buona figliuola was warmly received on 3 February 1790 with the composer conducting, but Pasquale Anfossi's I viaggiatori felici was less highly regarded, on account of both its music and its libretto, with the exception of inserted numbers composed by Cherubini, who took a bow at the insistence of the audience. The sixteen-year-old violinist Pierre Rode played a concerto by Viotti between the acts of Giuseppe Sarti's Le gelosie villane on 18 October. The company continued to perform in the theatre at the Saint-Germain fairground until 31 December 1790.

=== On the rue Feydeau ===
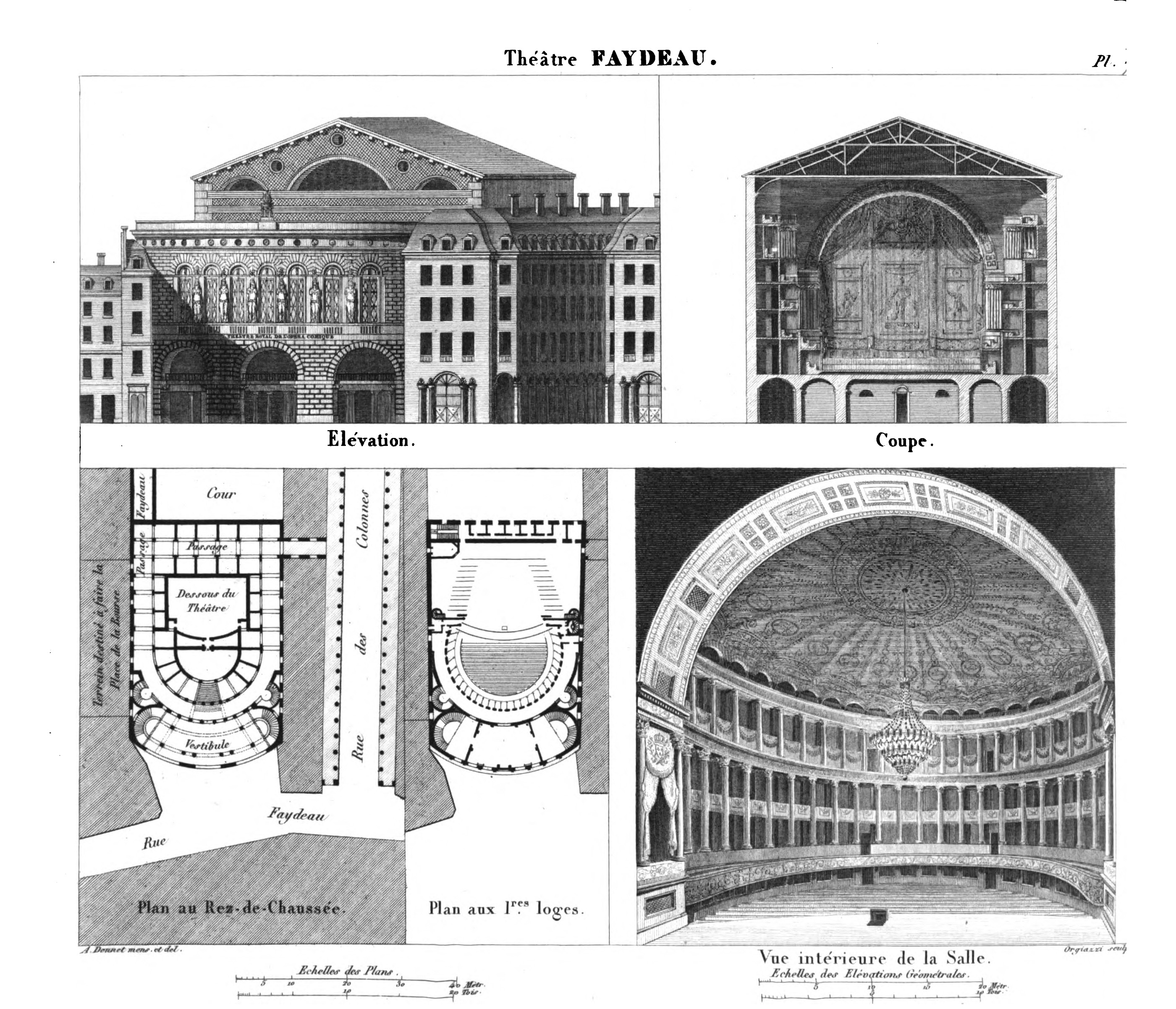
Architectural drawings of the Salle Feydeau

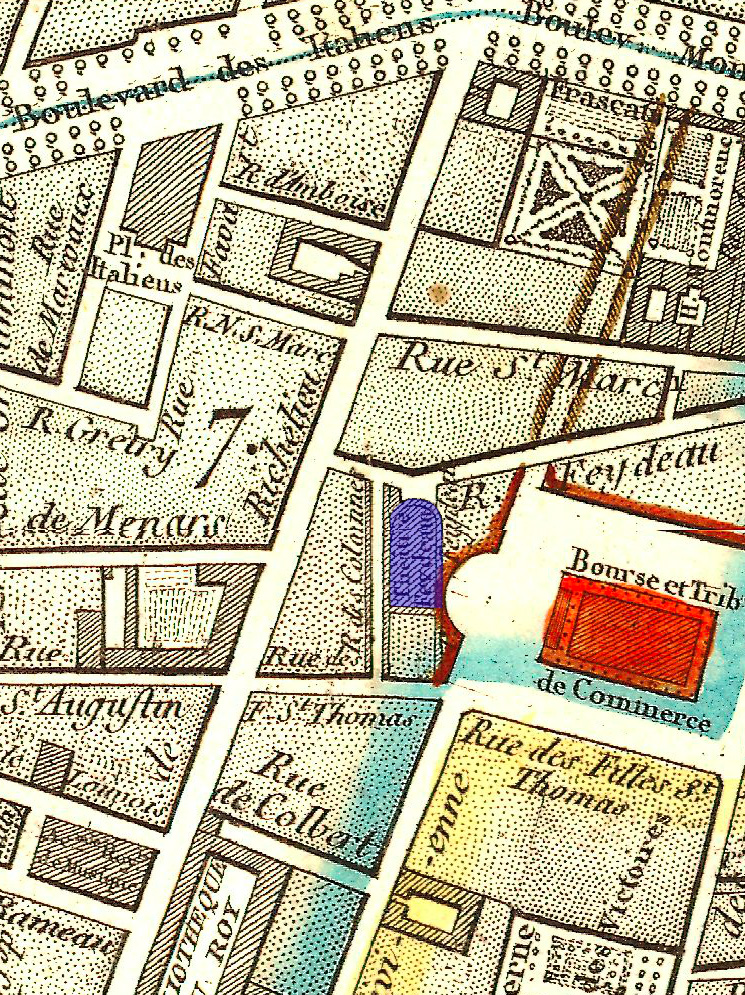
The Salle Feydeau (in blue) on an 1814 map of Paris

For the new theatre, a site just east of the north end of the Tuileries Palace, formerly occupied by the "Stables of Monsieur", was first considered. This location was thought advantageous, even at this late date, because the royal family could reach it without having to go out-of-doors. Several other sites were also considered, but by February 1790, a piece of land on the rue Feydeau was selected. Despite its proximity to the Salle Favart, home of the Opéra-Comique, and objections by Jean Sylvain Bailly, the mayor of Paris, permission was granted in April.

The new theatre on the rue Feydeau was built in just over six months in a neoclassical style to the designs by the architects Jacques Legrand and Jacques Molinos and had a capacity of 1700–1900. These designers were not too concerned with the practicality of the theatre space, but more with the splendor of the theatre. It was a rectangular building that was curved on the side of the lobby at the front. On the curved front were seven massive windows that let natural light into the lobby. In between these windows were statues that were the same height as the windows. The architects also included "carriage entrances at ground level that allowed theatre goers to disembark inside a protected vestibule" or entrance hall between an outer door and the main part of the building. These features, along with the statues on the outside of the lobby, were novel and attracted a lot of attention.

The lobby was highly ornate and was where Legrand and Molnios focused a lot of their attention. The theatre was lit by candlelight and by hanging chandeliers. There were seats in the pit as well as lining the sides of the theatre. There were three balconies and two different standing areas. There were also boxed seats next to the stage. Several "design flaws of the original plan would continue to haunt the theatre's administration." The proscenium "extended beyond the stage in such a way that it obstructed the view of the stage for most of the side loges". Bad sight lines were a problem with the original design of the theatre. The audience structure caused poor sound reverberations. There were two different remodeling projects, one in 1798 and one in 1801.

The opening there took place on 6 January 1791, when Sarti's 3-act comic opera Le nozze di Dorina was presented.

Up to 1791 the repertory had consisted primarily of Italian opera, with additional music added by Cherubini, but the exclusive privileges of the royal theatres were revoked on 13 January 1791. The company was now free to present French opéras comiques, competing more directly with the nearby Opéra-Comique company at the Salle Favart.

Upon the Royal Family's return to Paris on 24 June 1791, after its unsuccessful flight and arrest in Varennes, the Théâtre de Monsieur was officially renamed Théâtre Français & Italien de la rue Feydeau, but by July this had been shortened to Théâtre de la rue Feydeau, or simply the Théâtre Feydeau.

The first important French work was Cherubini's Lodoïska, which was premiered on 18 July 1791. This was followed by more French operas by Cherubini, as well as operas by French composers, including Devienne's Les visitandines (7 July 1792); Le Sueur's La caverne (16 February 1793), Paul et Virginie (13 January 1794), and Télémaque (10 May 1796); and Gaveaux's Léonore, ou L'amour conjugal (19 February 1798). The last was the model for Beethoven's Fidelio. In general, opera alternated evenings with spoken drama, presented by a separate company of actors.

The theatre became one of the meeting-places for counter-revolutionaries. Like many theatres of the Revolutionary period, it was frequently banned. However, it re-opened for good on 2 April 1796, becoming one of the most appreciated theatres in Paris. Talma produced there from 1798.

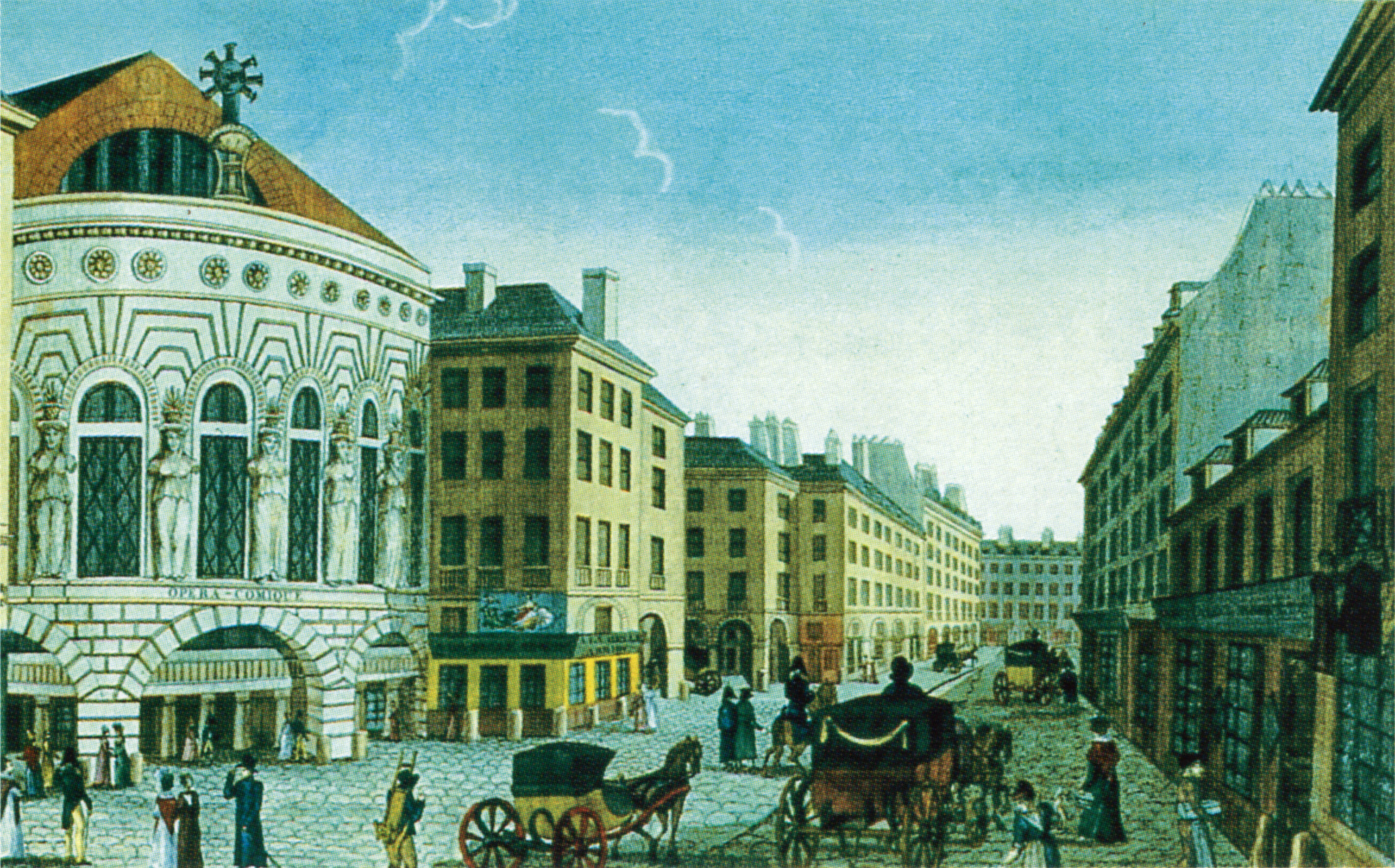
The Salle Feydeau as the Opéra-Comique (c. 1801–1804)

Sagaret directed the company from 1795 to 1799, but he also took on the management of two other theatres, the Théâtre de la République and the Théâtre de l'Odéon, and becoming overextended closed the Théâtre Feydeau on 12 April 1801. However, the Opéra-Comique, the Feydeau's chief rival, was also forced to close on 20 July 1801, and it was soon decided to merge the two companies under the name Opéra-Comique, which occurred on 16 September 1801. Since the previous Opéra-Comique's Salle Favart needed repairs, the merged company performed at the Salle Feydeau. Except for a short period from 23 July 1804 to 4 July 1805, when it performed at the Salle Favart and the Salle Olympique, it continued using the Salle Feydeau until 12 April 1829, after which the Salle Feydeau was demolished, and the new Opéra-Comique moved to a newly built theatre, the Salle Ventadour, opening there on 20 April 1829.

In La fille de Madame Angot, an opéra-comique by Charles Lecocq put on on 4 December 1872, the heroine Clairette Angot sings "Didn't you know Mademoiselle Lange, the great actress of the Feydeau?", thus mentioning the Théâtre Feydeau more than forty years after its demolition.

== Productions ==
- A revival of The Barber of Seville by Beaumarchais (March 1791).

== Premieres ==
- 1791: Lodoïska by Cherubini (18 July 1791)
- 1793: La caverne by Jean-François Le Sueur (16 February 1793)
- 1794: Eliza ou Le voyage aux glaciers du Mont Saint-Bernard by Cherubini (13 December 1794)
- 1797: Médée by Cherubini (13 March 1797)
- 1798: L'hôtellerie portugaise by Cherubini (25 July 1798)
- 1799: La punition by Cherubini (23 February 1799)
- 1800: Les deux journées, ou Le porteur d'eau by Cherubini (16 January 1800)

== Media ==
Dieu du bonheur, Dieu plein du charmes…
A polacca from Le trompeur trompé, an 1800 opéra comique which premièred at the Théâtre Feydeau. Performed on historical instruments, with Montserrat Alavedra as Agathe.
