= Dupaty =

Dupaty is a French surname. Notable people with the surname include:

- Charles Dupaty (1771–1825), French sculptor
- Emmanuel Dupaty (1775–1851), French playwright, naval officer, singer, and journalist
