= René de Chazet =

French playwright, poet and novelist (1774–1844)

- Born: René André Polydore Balthazar Alissan de Chazet; 23 October 1774; Paris
- Died: 23 August 1844 (aged 69); Paris
- Occupations: Poet, playwright, novelist

René de Chazet, full name René André Polydore Balthazar Alissan de Chazet, (23 October 1774 – 23 August 1844) was a French playwright, poet and novelist.

== Short biography ==
The son of an annuities controller, parent of Mackau, the ambassador of Naples, he accompanied him to Italy in 1792 and returned to France only in 1797. He collaborated with many newspapers and became known for his numerous plays, many of which written in collaboration with Charles-Augustin Sewrin. These plays were given in the most important Parisian stages of the first half of the XIXe century: Théâtre des Variétés, Comédie-Française, Théâtre du Palais-Royal, Théâtre du Vaudeville etc.

He competed in 1808 at the Académie française and won the first runner with his Éloge de Pierre Corneille. In 1814, he was pensioned by Louis XVIII, made a chevalier de la Légion d'honneur and appointed librarian of the king, then Finance receiver, a position he lost in 1830 when the regime fell.

== Works ==
He wrote 436 plays including:

- 1793: La Ruse villageoise, opéra comique in 1 act, in prose and in vaudevilles
- 1794: Le mot de l'énigme, vaudeville in 1 act, with Désaugiers and Lafortelle
- 1797: Arlequin journaliste, comedy in 1 act, en prose, mingled with vaudevilles, with Emmanuel Dupaty and Jean-Baptiste Mardelle
- 1797: Il faut un état, ou La revue de l'an six, proverbe in 1 act, in prose and in vaudevilles, with Jean-Michel-Pascal Buhan and François-Pierre-Auguste Léger
- 1797: Les français à Cythère, vaudeville, with Auguste Creuzé de Lesser and Emmanuel Dupaty
- 1798: Le Déménagement du salon, ou le Portrait de Gilles, comédie-parade in 1 act and in vaudevilles, with Noël Aubin, Dupaty et Léger
- 1799: La journée de Saint-Cloud, ou Le dix-neuf brumaire, divertissement-vaudeville in 1 act and in prose, with Armand Gouffé and Léger
- 1799: Champagnac et Suzette, comédie-vaudeville in 1 act
- 1799: Le Buste de Préville, impromptu in 1 act and in prose, with Dupaty
- 1799: Deux pour un, comedy in 1 act, mingled with vaudevilles, with Francis
- 1799: Il faut un état, proverbe in 1 act, with Léger
- 1800: Éloge de Cailly père
- 1800: Finot, proverbe archi-bête in 1 act
- 1800: La Lyre d'Anacréon, choix de romances, vaudevilles, rondes de table et ariettes
- 1800: Racine ou la Chute de Phèdre, comedy in 2 acts and on verse, mingled with vaudevilles, with Sewrin
- 1801: L'Hôtel garni, ou la Revue de l'an IX, comédie-vaudeville in 1 act, with Dieulafoy
- 1801: La Revue de l'an huit, suite de la Revue de l'an six, comédie-vaudeville in 1 act, with Dieulafoy and Gouffé
- 1801: Philippe le Savoyard, ou l'Origine des ponts-neufs, divertissement in 1 act and in prose mingled with vaudevilles, with Georges Duval and Armand Gouffé
- 1801: Le joueur d'échecs, vaudeville in 1 act, with Benoît-Joseph Marsollier des Vivetières
- 1802: 11, 76, 88, ou le Terne de Gonesse, vaudeville anecdote in 1 act and in prose, with Michel Dieulafoy and Jean-Baptiste Dubois
- 1802: Le Concert aux Champs-Élysées, vaudeville in 1 act, with Lafortelle
- 1802: Le Salomon de la rue de Chartres ou les Procès de l'an dix, revue épisodique, vaudeville in 1 act, with J-B Dubois
- 1802: La Première nuit manquée, ou Mon tour de garde, comédie-vaudeville in 1 act, with Dupaty
- 1802: Molière chez Ninon, ou La lecture de Tartufe, with J-B Dubois
- 1802: Le Mariage de Nina-Vernon, suite de la Petite ville, et des Provinciaux à Paris, comedy in 1 act and in prose, with Dieulafoy and J-B Dubois
- 1802: Un tour de jeune homme, anecdote in 1 act, with léger
- 1802: Étrennes à Geoffroy
- 1803: L'Amour et l'argent, ou le Créancier rival, comedy in 1 act, in prose, mingled with vaudevilles, with Lafortelle and Marc-Antoine Désaugiers
- 1803: Le Portrait de Juliette, vaudeville in 1 act, with Dupaty
- 1803: Cassandre aveugle, ou le Concert d'Arlequin, comédie-parade in 1 act, mingled with vaudevilles, with Théophile Marion Dumersan and Charles-François-Jean-Baptiste Moreau de Commagny
- 1803: Le Vin, le jeu et les femmes, ou les Trois défauts, comedy in 1 act, mingled with vaudevilles
- 1804: L'Amant soupçonneux, comedy in 1 act, in verse, with A.-M. Lafortelle
- 1804: Caponnet, ou l'Auberge supposée, vaudeville in 1 act, with Francis
- 1804: L'École des Gourmands, vaudeville in 1 act, with Francis and Lafortelle
- 1804: Ossian cadet, ou les Guimbardes, parody of the Bardes , vaudeville in 3 acts, with Dupaty
- 1804: Folie et raison, comedy in 1 act, with Sewrin
- 1804: Le Médecin de Palerme, comedy in 1 act, mingled with vaudevilles, with Sewrin
- 1804: L'hôtel de Lorraine, proverbe in 1 act, with Lafortelle
- 1804: La Leçon conjugale, ou l'Avis aux maris, comedy in 3 acts and in verse, with Sewrin
- 1804: Les Vélocifères, comédie-parade in 1 act, mingled with vaudevilles, with Charles-François-Jean-Baptiste Moreau de Commagny
- 1805: La fille jokey, vaudeville in 1 act, with Lafortelle
- 1805: Janvier et Nivôse, étrennes in vaudeville, with Sewrin
- 1805: La Laitière de Bercy, comédie anecdotique in 2 acts and in prose, mingled with vaudevilles, with Sewrin
- 1805: Éloge de La Harpe
- 1805: M. de Largillière, ou Mon Cousin de Dreux, comedy in 1 act, with Sewrin
- 1806: Les petites marionnettes ou La loterie
- 1806: Roquelaure, comedy in 1 act, mingled with vaudevilles
- 1806: La Belle hôtesse, comédy in 1 act, mingled with vaudevilles, with Léger
- 1806: La Petite métromanie, comedy in 1 act and in prose, mingled with vaudevilles
- 1806: Racine, comedy in 2 acts, with Sewrin
- 1806: Les Petites marionnettes, ou la Loterie, comedy in 1 act and in prose, mingled with vaudevilles
- 1806: Mademoiselle Gaussin, comedy in 1 act, mingled with vaudevilles
- 1806: Dubelloy, ou les Templiers, vaudeville in 1 act, with Lafortelle
- 1806: Le Politique en défaut, comedy in 1 act and in verse, with Sewrin
- 1806: La Duègne et le valet, comedy in 2 acts and in vaudevilles, with Sewrin
- 1806: Lundi, mardi et mercredi, ou Paris, Melun et Fontainebleau, comedy in 3 days and in vaudevilles, with Sewrin
- 1806: Le Chemin de Berlin, ou Halte militaire, divertissement-impromptu mingled with vaudevilles, with Sewrin
- 1807: La famille des lurons, vaudeville in 1 act, with Sewrin
- 1807: La famille des innocents ou Comme l'amour vient, comedy in 1 act, with Sewrin
- 1807: Pauvre Jacques, vaudeville, with Sewrin
- 1807: La Guerre et la paix, comedy in 3 acts
- 1807: L'Impromptu de Neuilly, divertissement in 1 act
- 1807: Romainville, ou la Promenade du dimanche, vaudeville grivois, poissard et villageois, in 1 act, with Sewrin
- 1807: L'Intrigue en l'air, comedy in 1 act, mingled with vaudevilles, with Sewrin
- 1807: François Ier, ou la Fête mystérieuse, comedy in 2 acts and in verse, mingled with ariettes, with Sewrin
- 1807: La Journée aux enlèvemens, comedy in 2 acts and in prose, mingled with vaudevilles, with Sewrin
- 1807: La Ligue des femmes ou le Roman de la rose, comédie anecdotique in 1 act, in prose mingled with vaudevilles, with Ourry
- 1808: Les Acteurs à l'épreuve, vaudeville épisodique in 1 act, with Charles-Augustin Sewrin
- 1808: Les Bourgeois campagnards, comedy in 1 act mingled with vaudevilles, with Sewrin
- 1808: Le Mari juge et partie, comedy in 1 act and in verse, with Ourry
- 1808: La Comédie au foyer, Épilogue en vaudevilles
- 1808: Odes couronnées le 20 janvier à la loge des Neuf-sœurs
- 1808: Habits, vieux galons, comedy in 1 act, mingled with vaudevilles, with Sewrin
- 1808: Ordre et désordre, comedy in 3 acts and in verse, with Sewrin
- 1808: Éloge de Pierre Corneille
- 1809: A bas Molière, comedy in 1 act, mingled with vaudevilles
- 1809: M. Asinard ou Le Volcan de Montmartre, folie in 1 act, mingled with couplets, with Ourry
- 1809: La Leçon de l'oncle, ou Il était tems !, comedy in 1 act and in prose, mingled with vaudevilles, with Sewrin
- 1809: Esprit de l'Almanach des Muses depuis sa création jusqu'à ce jour
- 1809: L'Écu de six francs, ou l'Héritage, comedy in 1 act and in prose, mingled with couplets, with Sewrin
- 1809: Le Caporal Schlag, ou la Ferme de Muldorf, one-act play, mingled with couplets, with Sewrin
- 1809: Le fils par hasard, ou Ruse et folie, comedy in 5 acts, in prose, with Ourry
- 1810: Les baladines, folie in 1 act, in prose, mingled with couplets
- 1810: Les Commères, ou la Boule de neige, comedy in 1 act and in prose, mingled with vaudevilles, with Sewrin
- 1810: Les Commissionnaires, ou Récompense honnête, comedy in 1 act and in prose, mingled with couplets, with Ourry
- 1810: La Cendrillon des écoles, ou le Tarif des prix, comédie-vaudeville in 1 act, in prose, with J-B Dubois
- 1810: Le Bouquet de roses, ou le Chansonnier des grâces
- 1810: Le Jardinier de Schoenbrunn, ou le Bouquet de noces, comedy
- 1810: Le Mai d'amour, ou le Rival complaisant, comedy in 1 act and in prose, mingled with couplets, with Ourry
- 1810: Monsieur Grégoire ou Courte et bonne
- 1810: Charles et Emma, ou les Amis d'enfance, with August Lafontaine
- 1810: Coco Pépin, ou la Nouvelle année, étrennes in 1 act, mingled with vaudevilles, with Sewrin
- 1810: La Double méprise, comedy in 1 act, in prose
- 1810: La Fête du château, bouquet en vaudevilles
- 1811: Le Billet de loterie, comedy in 1 act, with Léger
- 1811: Les Hommes femmes, folie in 1 act mingled with couplets, with Ourry
- 1811: Les Orgues de Barbarie, comedy in 1 act and in prose, mingled with couplets, with Sewrin
- 1811: L'Officier de quinze ans, divertissement in 1 act
- 1811: La Grande famille, ou la France en miniature, divertissement in 1 act and in vaudevilles
- 1811: Le Chantier de Saardam, ou l'Impromptu hollandais, divertissement
- 1812: L'Art de causer, épître d'un père à son fils
- 1812: La Famille mélomane, comédy in 1 act, mingled with couplets, with Ourry
- 1812: Les Russes en Pologne, tableau historique depuis 1762 jusqu'à nos jours
- 1812: Je m'émancipe, comédie-vaudeville in 1 act, with J-B Dubois
- 1812: Les Filles à marier, ou l'Opéra de Quinault, comedy in 1 act, mingled with couplets, with Antoine Simonnin
- 1813: La Ci-devant jeune femme, comedy in 1 act, mingled with couplets, with Simonnin
- 1812 Les Poètes en voyage, ou le Bouquet impromptu, vaudeville in 1 act, with Désaugiers
- 1814: Bayard à Mézières, opéra comique in 1 act, with Dupaty
- 1814: Lecoq, ou les Valets en deuil, comedy in 1 act mingled with couplets, with Simonnin
- 1814: La Cabale au village, comedy in 1 act, mingled with couplets, with Simonnin
- 1814: La Batelière du Loiret, comedy in 1 act, mingled with vaudevilles, with Maurice Ourry
- 1816: Chacun son tour, ou l'Écho de Paris, divertissement villageois in vaudevilles, with Marc-Antoine Désaugiers and Michel-Joseph Gentil de Chavagnac
- 1817: Les Trois Journées, ou Recueil des différens ouvrages que l'auteur a eu l'honneur d'adresser, au nom de la Garde nationale, à Sa Majesté et à S. A. R. Monsieur, pour l'anniversaire des 12 avril et 4 mai 1814 et du 8 juillet 1815
- 1817: Tableau des élections, depuis 1789 jusqu'en 1816, suivi de Quelques idées sur les élections prochaines
- 1817: Les deux Macbeth impromptu
- 1818: Les Femmes officiers, ou Un jour sous les armes, comedy in 1 act mingled with vaudevilles, with J-B Dubois
- 1818: La Statue de Henri IV, ou la Fête du Pont-Neuf, tableau grivois in 1 act, with Désaugiers, Michel-Joseph Gentil de Chavagnac and Joseph Pain
- 1819: M. Partout, ou le Dîner manqué, tableau-vaudeville in 1 act, with Désaugiers and Léger
- 1819: La robe feuille morte, one-act play
- 1820: Éloge historique de... Charles-Ferdinand d'Artois, duc de Berry
- 1820: La nuit et la journée du 29 septembre 1820, ou Détails authentiques de tout ce qui s'est passé le jour de la naissance de monseigneur le duc de Bordeaux
- 1820: Le Berceau du prince, ou les Dames de Bordeaux, à-propos vaudeville in 1 act, with Nicolas Brazier, Marc-Antoine Désaugiers, Jean-Baptiste Dubois and Michel-Joseph Gentil de Chavagnac
- 1821: Les Arts rivaux, intermède
- 1821: Un dimanche à Passy, ou M. Partout, tableau-vaudeville in 1 act, with Désaugiers and Léger, 1821
- 1821: Le concert d'amateurs, comedy in 1 act, with Brazier
- 1822: Relation des fêtes données par la ville de Paris et de toutes les cérémonies qui ont eu lieu dans la capitale à l'occasion de la naissance et du baptême de Mgr le duc de Bordeaux
- 1822: L'Inauguration de la statue de Louis XIV, ode
- 1822: Les Royalistes à la Chaumière
- 1822: Le Matin et le soir, ou la Fiancée et la mariée, comedy in 2 acts, mingled with couplets, with Armand d'Artois and Emmanuel Théaulon
- 1822: L'Écarté, ou Un lendemain de bal, comédy in 1 act, mingled with vaudevilles, with Jacques-André Jacquelin and Maurice Ourry
- 1823: Le Deux Mai ou la Fête de Saint-Ouen, divertissement in 1 act
- 1823: La France et l'Espagne, ou les Deux familles, intermède
- 1823: Les Femmes de chambre, vaudeville in 1 act, with Sewrin
- 1824: Le Conciliateur, ou Trente mois de l'histoire de France
- 1824: Louis XVIII à son lit de mort, ou Récit exact et authentique de ce qui s'est passé au château des Tuileries, les 13, 14, 15 et 16 septembre 1824
- 1829: Des mœurs, des lois et des abus, tableaux du jour
- 1829: Mémoires posthumes, lettres et pièces authentiques touchant la vie et la mort de Charles-François, duc de Rivière
- 1834: La jolie voyageuse ou Les deux Giroux, anecdote contemporaine in 1 act, with Achille d'Artois and Joseph-Bernard Rosier
- 1836: Les chansons de Désaugiers, comedy in 5 acts mingled with couplets, with Frédéric de Courcy and Emmanuel Théaulon
- 1836: La Cour des miracles, chronique de 1450, vaudeville in 2 acts (from The Hunchback of Notre-Dame by Victor Hugo), with Jean-Pierre Lesguillon and Emmanuel Théaulon
- 1836: Du Pain et de l'eau, comédie anecdote in 1 act
- 1837: Charles X, esquisse historique
- 1837: Mémoires, souvenirs, œuvres et portraits
- 1840: Eudoxie ou Le meunier de Harlem
- undated: Hymne à l'amitié, romance nouvelle with piano or harp
- undated: Le Vingt-un janvier, chant funèbre
- undated: Vive le roi ! ou le chant d'un français

== Bibliography ==
- François-Xavier Feller, Charles Weiss, Biographie universelle, 1848, p. 586-587
- J. Goizet, A. Burtal, Dictionnaire universel du Théâtre en France et du théatre français, vol.2, 1867, p. 28-33
- Dictionnaire de biographie française, vol.8, Letouzay, 1959, p. 962
- David Chaillou, Napoléon et l'Opéra: La politique sur la scène (1810–1815), 2004
