= Armand Joseph Overnay =

French chansonnier and playwright

- Born: 1 November 1798; Paris
- Died: 14 September 1869 (aged 70); Paris
- Occupations: Playwright, chansonnier

Armand Joseph Overnay (1 November 1798 – 14 September 1869) was a 19th-century French chansonnier and playwright.

He was a son of the chansonnier Nicolas Jean Marie Overnay (born in 1769), one of the members of the Soupers de Momus, and an examiner of dramatic works. Armand Joseph Overnay's plays were presented on the most important Parisian stages of his time including the Théâtre de l'Ambigu-Comique, the Théâtre des Folies-Dramatiques, the Théâtre du Palais-Royal, the Théâtre du Gymnase, and the Théâtre de la Porte-Saint-Antoine.

== Works ==
- 1819: Les Bolivars et les Morillos, caricatures in action, in 1 act mingled with vaudevilles, with Gabriel de Lurieu
- 1820: Le Mari confident, comédie-vaudeville in 1 act, with Jean Berrier and E. F. Varez
- 1821: L'Épicurien malgré lui, vaudeville in 1 act, with Berrier
- 1823: Les Deux Lucas, vaudeville in 1 act, with Berrier
- 1823: Fanny, melodrama in 3 acts, extravaganza, with Lamarque de Saint-Victor
- 1824: Félix et Roger, one-act play, with Berrier and Hippolyte Lévesque
- 1825: L'Entrée à Reims, divertissement in 1 act, with Antoine-Marie Coupart and Jacques-André Jacquelin
- 1825: Les Deux réputations, comédie-vaudeville in 1 act, with Théodore Nézel
- 1826: Six mois de constance, comédy in 1 act, mingled with couplets, with Nézel and Berrier
- 1826: Le Banqueroutier, melodrama in 3 acts, with Nézel
- 1826: La Couturière, drama in 3 acts, with Nézel
- 1826: La Nuit des noces, drama in 3 acts, with Nézel
- 1826: La dame voilée, comedy in 3 acts, with Berrier and Nézel
- 1826: La Chambre de Clairette, ou les Visites par la fenêtre, vaudeville in 1 act, with Nézel
- 1827: Cartouche, melodrama in 3 acts, with Nézel
- 1827: Sainte-Périne, ou l'Asile des vieillards, tableau-vaudeville in 1 act, with Théaulon and Eugène de Lamerlière
- 1828: Le Chasseur noir, melodrama in 3 acts extravaganza, with Benjamin Antier, Frédérick Lemaître and Nézel
- 1830: Les lanciers et les marchandes de modes, one-act play, mingled with couplets, with Antier, Nézel and Varez
- 1830: Je ne chanterai plus ou Les derniers moments d'un épicurien, romance, adagio
- 1831: John Bull, ou le Chaudronnier anglais, play in 2 acts, with Nézel and Varez
- 1831: La Fille unique, vaudeville in 1 act, with Michel-Nicolas Balisson de Rougemont and Saint-Amand
- 1831: Le Watchman, drama in 3 acts and 6 tableaux, with Antier and Adrien Payn
- 1831: Le Tir et le restaurant, comédie-vaudeville in 1 act, with Nézel and Payn
- 1831: Les Fous dramatiques, vaudeville in 1 act, with Saint-Amand
- 1833: Marie-Rose, ou la Nuit de Noël, drama in 3 acts, with Saint-Amand and Payn
- 1834: Judith et Holopherne, an episode of the first war of Spain, vaudeville in 2 acts, with Emmanuel Théaulon and Nézel
- 1835: L'heure du rendez-vous
- 1835: Un talisman sous M. de Sartines, vaudeville in 1 act, with Nézel
- 1836: Le Doyen de Killerine, comédie-vaudeville in 2 acts, after the novel by abbé Prévost, with Payn
- 1837: Lebel, ou Le premier valet de chambre, comédie-vaudeville en un act
- 1838: L'Enfant de Paris, ou Misère et liberté, vaudeville in 1 act, with Nézel
- 1840: La Peur du tonnerre, vaudeville in 1 act, with Payn
- 1846: Souvenir de l'Empire, comédie-vaudeville in 2 acts
- 1850: Les Deux célibats, comedy in 3 acts, in prose, with Jules de Wailly
- 1850: La famille du mari, comedy in 3 acts, with de Wailly
- 1851: Contre fortune bon cœur, comédie-vaudeville in 1 act, with de Wailly

== See also ==
- Gabriel-Alexandre Belle

== Bibliography ==
- Joseph Marie Quérard, Félix Bourquelot, Charles Louandre, La littérature française contemporaine. XIXe siècle, 1854, p. 569-570
- Pierre LaroueGabriel-Alexandre Bellesse, Grand dictionnaire universel du XIXe siècle (suppl.), vol.16, 1864
- Jules Gay, Bibliographie des ouvrages relatifs à l'amour, aux femmes, 1872, p. 397
