= Jean-Baptiste Mardelle =

French playwright and novelist (1785–1839)

Jean-Baptiste Alexandre Mardelle
- Born: 1 February 1785; Versailles, Paris, France
- Died: 1 September 1839 (aged 54); Paris, France
- Occupations: Playwright, novelist

Jean-Baptiste Alexandre Mardelle (1 February 1785 – 1 September 1839) was an early 19th-century French playwright and novelist.

A NCO, he left the army in 1815 to devote himself to literature. His plays were presented at the Théâtre du Vaudeville and the Théâtre de l'Ambigu-Comique.

== Works ==
- 1798: Arlequin journaliste, comedy in 1 act, in prose, mingled with vaudevilles, with René de Chazet and Emmanuel Dupaty
- 1807: Baudoin, comte de Provence ou le retour des croisades, melodrama in 3 acts
- 1810: Frédéric, Duc de Nevers, melodrama in 3 acts, with E. F. Varez
- 1818: Les Princes norwégiens, ou le Fraticide supposé
- 1819: Les Ruines de Rothembourg
- 1822: L'aveugle de Valence, ou L'ermitage de Roquebrune, 5 vols.
- 1829: La chute d'un grand homme, 3 vols.
- 1830: Gustave Wasa, ou La Suède au seizième siècle, 5 vols.
- 1836: La Petite maison d'Auteuil
- 1836: La Croix de pierre
