= E. F. Varez =

French playwright and writer

Emmanuel François Varez called E. F. Varez (17 October 1780 – 8 September 1866) was an early 19th-century French playwright and novelist.

Born in the 1st arrondissement of Paris, Varez was a dramaturge at the Théâtre de l'Ambigu-Comique and the Théâtre de la Gaîté and his plays were presented, with some exceptions, on the stages of these two theatres.

He died in the 16th arrondissement of Paris.

== Works ==
- Le Gourmand puni, comedy in 1 act, 1803
- La Fille coupable, repentante, melodrama in 3 acts, extravaganza, 1804
- Une journée de Frédéric II, roi de Prusse, comédie-anecdote, in 1 act and in prose, 1804
- Le Criminel invisible, novel, 2 vol, Lacourière, 1807
- Frédéric de Guéréhard, duc de Lorraine, novel, 2 vol, Masson, 1808
- L'Homme de la forêt, novel, 2 vol, Collin, 1808
- Métusko, ou les Polonais, melodrama in 3 acts, extravaganza, from the novel by Pigault-Lebrun, with Séville, 1808
- Frédéric duc de Nevers, melodrama in 3 acts, with Jean-Baptiste Mardelle, 1810, music by Henry Darondeau
- Hilberge l'amazone, ou les Monténégrins, pantomime in 3 acts, with Jean-Guillaume-Antoine Cuvelier, 1810
- Herminie ou la Chaumière allemande, melodrama in 3 acts, extravaganza, 1812
- Laissez-moi faire, ou la Soubrette officieuse, vaudeville in 1 act, with Armand Séville, 1813
- Une vengeance de l'amour, ballet-pantomime in 1 act, extravaganza, 1813
- Vive la paix ! ou le Retour au village, impromptu in 1 act, mingled with songs and danses, with Coupart, 1814
- Le Troubadour portugais, melodrama in 3 acts, extravaganza, 1815
- Voilà notre bouquet ! ou le Cabinet littéraire, impromptu-vaudeville in 1 act, with Coupart, 1815
- Retournons à Paris, comedy in 1 act, mingled with vaudevilles, with Aimé Desprez, 1817
- Les Deux fugitifs, comedy in 2 acts, 1818
- Calas, drama in 3 acts and in prose, with Victor Ducange, 1819
- L'Ours et l'enfant, ou la Fille bannie, mimodrame in 3 acts, with Cuvelier, 1819
- Le Mari confident, comédie-vaudeville in 1 act, with Overnay and Jean-François-Constant Berrier, 1820
- Sigismond, ou les Rivaux illustres, melodrama in 3 acts and extravaganza, 1820
- Le Baptême, ou la Double fête, vaudeville in 1 act, with Antoine-Marie Coupart, 1821
- La Famille irlandaise, melodrama in 3 acts, with Théodore Nézel, 1821
- Adieu la Chaussée-d'Antin, comedy in 1 act, mingled with couplets, with Hippolyte Magnien, 1822
- Élodie, ou la Vierge du monastère, melodrama in 3 acts, 1822
- L'Inconnu, ou les Mystères, melodrama in 3 acts, 1822
- Un trait de bienfaisance, ou la Fête d'un bon maire, à-propos in 1 act mingled with couplets, with Coupart, 1822
- La Poule aux œufs d'or, ou l'Amour et la fortune, comédie-féerie in 1 act, mingled with vaudevilles, 1823
- Entre chien et loup, comedy in 1 act and in prose, with Magnien, 1824
- La Fête d'automne, tableau villageois in 1 act mingled with vaudevilles, with Coupart and Jacquelin, 1824
- Le Retour d'un brave, vaudeville in 1 act for the King's day, with Coupart and Jacquelin, 1824
- Le Petit postillon de Fimes, ou Deux fêtes pour une, historical à-propos in 1 act, with Coupart and Jacquelin, 1825
- Le Jour fatal, novel, Bouquin de La Souche, 1826
- Le Fils de l'invalide, one-act play, mingled with couplets, with Coupart, 1826
- La Demoiselle et la paysanne, comedy in 1 act and in prose, with Théodore Nézel, 1828
- Les lanciers et les marchandes de modes, one-act play, mingled with couplets, with Benjamin Antier, Nézel and Overnay, 1828
- La Comédie au château, one-act play, mingled with couplets, with Coupart and Jacques-André Jacquelin, 1829
- John Bull, ou le Chaudronnier anglais, play in 2 acts, with Nezel and Armand Joseph Overnay, 1830
- Tout pour ma fille, drame-vaudeville in 3 acts, mingled with couplets, with Charles Henri Ladislas Laurençot, Lubize and Petit, 1832
- Le Tartufe de village, vaudeville in 1 act, with Lubize and Petit, 1833
- Chambre à louer, comédie-vaudeville in 1 act, 1834
- Le Château d'Oppenheim, novel, Bibliothèque de romans nouveaux, 1834
- Une partie de campagne, novel, Bibliothèque des romans nouveaux, 1834
- Le Fils de Ninon, drama in 3 acts, mingled with songs, with Jacques-Arsène-François-Polycarpe Ancelot et Hippolyte Rimbaut, 1834
- Eustache, folie-vaudeville in 1 act, 1839

== Bibliography ==
- Joseph Marie Quérard, La France littéraire, vol. 10 (VAB-ZYG), 1839, p. 52–54.
- J. M. Quérard, Les Supercheries littéraires dévoilées, vol. 5 (1853), p. 396.
