= Henriquez =

Henriquez or Henríquez may refer to:

- Alexis Henriquez (born 1983), Colombian footballer
- Amílcar Henríquez (born 1983), Panamanian footballer
- Ángelo Henríquez (born 1994), Chilean footballer
- Astor Henríquez (born 1983), Honduran footballer
- Camilo Henríquez (1769–1825), Chilean priest, author, and politician
- Carlos Henriquez (musician) (born 1979), Puerto Rican jazz bassist
- Craig Henriquez (born 1959), biomedical engineer, professor at Duke University
- Crisóstomo Henríquez (1594–1632), Spanish priest and theologian
- David Henríquez (footballer, born 1977), Chilean footballer
- David Henríquez (footballer, born 1998), Chilean footballer
- Edgardo Henriquez (born 2002), Venezuelan baseball player
- Enrique Henríquez (1536–1608), Portuguese priest and theologian
- Gregory Henriquez (born 1963), Canadian architect
- Isabella Henríquez (c. 1610–c. 1680), Sephardi Jewish poet
- José Henríquez (born 1987), Salvadoran footballer
- Luis Henríquez (born 1981), Panamanian footballer
- Louis-Marin Henriquez (born 1765), French writer
- May Henriquez (1915–1999), Curaçaoan writer and sculptor
- Miguel Henríquez (c. 1680–1743), Puerto Rican privateer
- Óscar Henríquez (born 1974), Venezuelan baseball player
- Oswaldo Henríquez (born 1989), Colombian footballer
- Pedro Henríquez Ureña (1884–1946), Dominican Republic writer
- Quisqueya Henríquez (born 1966), Cuban-born Dominican Republic visual artist
- Raúl Silva Henríquez (1907–1999), Chilean Catholic cardinal
- Ronny Henríquez (born 2000), Dominican baseball player
- Tatico Henriquez, Dominican musician
- Thaïs Henríquez, Spanish synchronized swimmer

== See also ==
- National Library Felipe Henríquez, Dominican Republic national library
