= Jacques-André Jacquelin =

French playwright, lyricist, chansonnier, goguettier and poet

- Born: 18 March 1776; Paris
- Died: 13 August 1827 (aged 51); Paris
- Occupations: Playwright, lyricist, chansonnier, poet

Jacques-André Jacquelin (18 March 1776 – 13 August 1827) was a French playwright, lyricist, chansonnier, goguettier and poet.

== Biography ==
A chief clerk at the Ministry of War, he became inspector of secondary theaters of Paris.

Jacquelin authored about forty plays, all of which are now long forgotten, and the Dictionnaire historique abrégé des hommes célèbres depuis les temps les plus reculés jusqu'à nos jours.

He was a member of the société du Caveau of which he became general secretary in 1815.

== Works ==
Theatre

- La Nièce de ma tante Aurore, ou la Manie des romans, one-act comedy, Paris, Théâtre de la rue de Thionville, 7 March 1794
- Les Fureurs de l'amour, tragédie burlesque in 7 scenes and in verse, with Joseph-Henri Flacon Rochelle, Paris, Jeunes-Artistes, 9 June 1798
- Jean La Fontaine, comédie anecdotique in 1 act and i prose, mingled with vaudevilles, Paris, Jeunes-Artistes, 23 September 1798
- L’Enfant de l’amour, suite des Fureurs de l’amour, tragédie burlesque in 1 act and in verse, Paris, Jeunes-Artistes, 2 March 1799
- Jean Racine avec ses enfants, comédie anecdotique in 1 act and in prose, mingled with vaudevilles, Paris, Jeunes-Artistes, 21 April 1799
- L'Antiquomanie, ou le Mariage sous la cheminée, one-act comedy in prose, Paris, Jeunes-Artistes, 27 May 1799 Text online
- La Clef forée, comédie anecdotique in 1 act and in prose, mingled with vaudevilles, with François-Pierre-Auguste Léger, Paris, 4 July 1799
- Le Peintre dans son ménage, two-act comedy in prose, mingled with vaudevilles, with A.-M. Lafortelle, Paris, Jeunes-Artistes, 21 October 1799
- Pradon sifflé, battu et content, comédie anecdote in 1 act and in vaudevilles, with Joseph-Henri Flacon Rochelle, Paris, Jeunes-Artistes, 4 August 1800
- Le Tableau de Raphaël, ou À trompeur trompeur et demi, comédie-proverbe in 1 act and in vaudevilles, with Joseph-Henri Flacon Rochelle, Paris, Jeunes-Artistes, 9 October 1800
- Le Hasard corrigé par l’amour, ou la Fille en loterie, arlequinade in 1 act and in vaudevilles, with Joseph-Henri Flacon Rochelle, Paris, Théâtre des Jeunes-Artistes, 12 January 1801
- Molière avec ses amis, ou le Souper d'Auteuil, historical comedy in 2 acts and in vaudevilles, with Antoine-François Rigaud, Paris, Jeunes-Artistes, 28 January 1801 Text online
- Cinq et deux font trois, ou le Marchand d'esprit, comédie proverbe in 1 act in verse and in vaudevilles, Paris, Jeunes-Artistes, 18 December 1801
- Gille en deuil, opera in 1 act, with Marc-Antoine-Madeleine Désaugiers and Armand Croizette, music by Niccolò Piccinni, Paris, Théâtre Montansier, 3 August 1802
- Cric-crac, ou l'Habit du Gascon, comédie-vaudeville in 1 act, with Marc-Antoine-Madeleine Désaugiers, Paris, Montansier, 17 January 1803
- L’Amour à l'anglaise, comédie vaudeville in 1 act in prose, with Michel-Nicolas Balisson de Rougemont, Paris, Théâtre des jeunes élèves de la rue de Thionville, 24 February 1803 Text online
- Le Magister et le Meunier, ou les Escobarderies villageoises, comédie-vaudeville in 1 act, from an ancient fabliau, with Marc-Antoine-Madeleine Désaugiers, Paris, Théâtre de la rue Dauphine, 10 March 1803
- La Mort de Néron, folie anecdotique in 1 act and in prose, mingled with vaudevilles, Paris, Théâtre des jeunes élèves de la rue de Thionville, 6 May 1803
- Le Jalou de village, ou le Petit bonnet jaune, opéra-vaudeville in 1 act, Paris, 22 February 1804
- Pelisson, ou C'est le diable, comédie anecdotique in 1 act and in vaudevilles, with Joseph-Henri Flacon Rochelle, Paris, Montansier, 18 April 1807
- Levez la toile ! pièce épisodique in 1 act and in vaudevilles, Paris, Théâtre de l'Ambigu-Comique, 31 May 1820
- L’Écarté, ou Un lendemain de bal, one-act comedy, mingled with vaudevilles, with Maurice Ourry and René de Chazet, Paris, Théâtre du Vaudeville, 25 September 1822
- Le Passage militaire, ou la Désertion par honneur, one-act entertainment, with Antoine-Marie Coupart, Paris, Ambigu-Comique, 24 August 1823
- Les Deux Proscrits, ou l'Hospitalité généreuse, one-act play, Paris, 25 August 1823, fêtes municipales offertes à Sa Majesté par M. le préfet de la Seine
- Fête à la halle ! ou le Retour de nos braves, tableau épisodique in 1 act, with Antoine-Marie Coupart, Paris, Ambigu-Comique, 13 December 1823
- Le Retour d'un brave, vaudeville in 1 act, with Antoine-Marie Coupart and E. F. Varez, Paris, Ambigu-Comique, 24 August 1824
- La Fête d'automne, tableau villageois in 1 act, with Antoine-Marie Coupart and E.-F. Varez, Paris, Ambigu-Comique, 4 November 1824
- L'Entrée à Reims, one-act entertainment, with Antoine-Marie Coupart and Armand Joseph Overnay, Paris, Ambigu-Comique, 29 May 1825
- Les Fils de Pharamond, ou la Forêt enchantée, vaudeville féerie in 3 acts extravaganza, Paris, Théâtre d'élèves, 7 June 1825
- Bravoure et Clémence, ou les Vertus de Henri IV, pantomime in 3 acts, Paris, Théâtre des Champs-Élysées, 8 June 1825
- Un trait de Charlemagne, ou Éginard et Imma, drame héroïque in 3 acts, Paris, fêtes municipales offertes par la ville de Paris à S. M. Charles X, à l'occasion de la Saint-Charles, 3 November 1825
- Le Petit Postillon de Fimes, ou Deux fêtes pour une, à propos historique in 1 act, with Antoine-Marie Coupart and E.-F. Varez, Paris, Ambigu-Comique, 4 November 1825
- Le Béarnais, ou l'Enfance de Henri IV, à-propos mingled with couplets, with Eugène Hyacinthe Laffillard, Paris, Théâtre Seveste, 4 November 1826
- La Circulaire, one-act comedy in 1 act and in prose, with Gabriel-Alexandre Belle, Paris, Théâtre de la Gaîté, 10 June 1828
- La Comédie au château, one-act play mingled with couplets, with Antoine-Marie Coupart and E.-F. Varez, Paris, Théâtre des Jeunes-Artistes of M. Louis Comte, 26 May 1829

Varia

- 1802-1803: Honorine, ou Mes vingt-deux ans, histoire véritable de Mlle D***
- 1804-1808: Almanach des Grâces, ou les Hommages à la beauté
- 1805: Histoire des Templiers, ouvrage impartial recueilli des meilleurs écrivains Text online
- 1809-1810: Le Chansonnier de la cour et de la ville
- 1810: La Lyre maçonnique, étrennes aux francs-maçons et à leurs sœurs, for the year M.DCCC.IX
- 1811: Ode sur la naissance du roi de Rome
- 1811: Pot-pourri chanté, 11 August 1811, à la fête de Mme Jacquelin, née Suzanne Davesne
- 1814: Le Chansonnier des Bourbons, with Michel-Nicolas Balisson de Rougemont Text online
- 1815: Recueil de chansons, choisies et chantées par Jacquelin
- 1816: Le Chansonnier franc-maçon, composé de cantiques de banquet, échelles d'adoption, rondes, vaudevilles chansons et couplets
- 1816: Chansons chantées aux Champs-Élysées pour la fête du Roi, le 25 août 1816, with Marc-Antoine Désaugiers
- 1816: La Galerie des badauds célèbres, ou Vivent les enfants de Paris !, chansonnette biographique, étrennes parisiennes for 1816
- 1819: Le Sang des Bourbons, galerie historique des rois et princes de cette maison depuis Henri IV jusqu'à nos jours
- 1825: Manuel de biographie, ou Dictionnaire historique abrégé des hommes célèbres depuis les temps les plus reculés jusqu'à nos jours, composé sur le plan du Dictionnaire de la fable by Chompré Text online
