= Noël Aubin =

French playwright, translator and bookseller

Noël Aubin (23 December 1754 in Tours – 18 August 1835 in Tours) was an 18th/19th-century French bookseller-publisher and playwright.

The son of a waxmaster whose profession he first continued, he was arrested in Tours and released in An III then established himself as publisher and bookseller in Paris (1795), working in association with printer-bookseller J.-M. Chevet.

Between 1799 and 1802, he published several comedies under the pen names Desfougerais or Desfougerets and published (1793–1797) and translated (1795–1802) various works, especially by British authors such as James Harrington, William Cooke or Oliver Goldsmith. His own plays were then given at the Théâtre du Vaudeville.

He put an end at his bookselling activity (1814), and returned to Tours where he published, as well in Blois and Loches, several theatre plays. He died in Tours in August 1835.

== Works ==
- 1798: Le Rosier, song, music by Émile Deschamps
- 1799: Le Déménagement du Salon ou le Portrait de Gilles, comédie-parade in 1 act and in comédie en vaudeville, with René de Chazet, François-Pierre-Auguste Léger and Emmanuel Dupaty
- 1799: Gilles aéronaute, ou L'Amérique n'est pas loin, comédie-parade in 1 act, mingled with vaudevilles, with Armand Gouffé ans Jean-Michel-Pascal Buhan
- 1799: Les Deux Bluettes, comedy
- 1800: Chamfortiana, ou Recueil choisi d'anecdotes piquantes et de traits d'esprit de Chamfort
- 1802: Pannard, clerc de procureur, comédie-vaudeville in 1 act and in prose
- 1815: Les Avoués en voyage, ou la Méprise, comedy in 2 acts and in prose
- 1824: L'Ami des pauvres et de son pays, ou l'Ennemi des abus, comedy
- 1824: La Maladie de l'imagination, peinte par l'homme de la nature, comedy
- 1824: Les Trois Domiciles, ou le Pauvre rentier, comedy in 2 acts and in prose

== Bibliography ==
- Joseph-Marie Quérard, La France littéraire, vol.1, 1828, (p. 511)
- Joseph-Marie Quérard, Les supercheries littéraires dévoilées, 1869, (p. 915)
