= Armand Gouffé =

French poet, chansonnier, goguettier and vaudevillist (1775–1845)

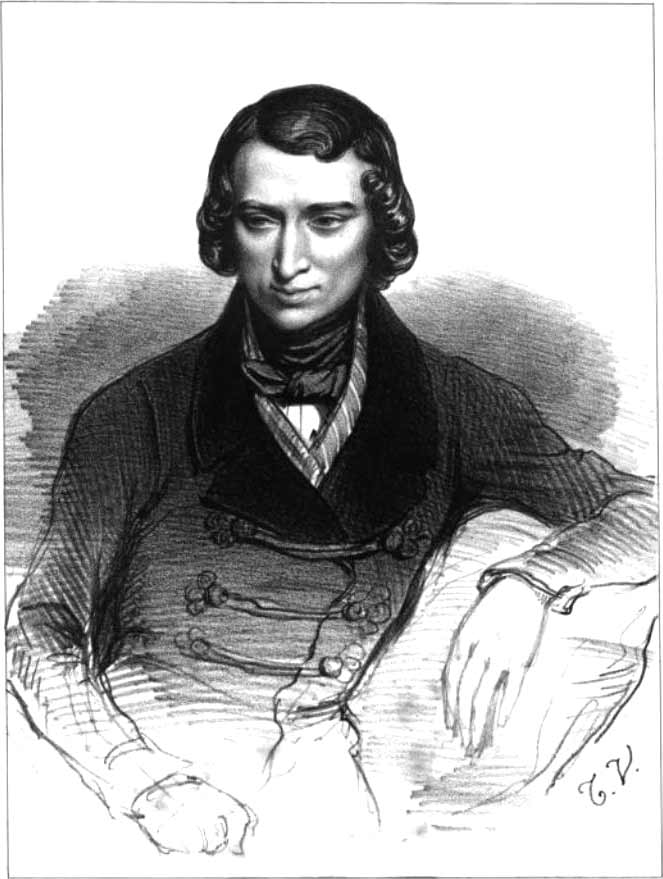
- Born: 22 March 1775; Paris
- Died: 19 October 1845 (aged 70); Beaune
- Other names: Playwright, chansonnier

Armand Gouffé (22 March 1775 – 19 October 1845) was a 19th-century French poet, chansonnier, goguettier and vaudevillist.

== Career ==
Hired as an employee in the Finance Ministry, he became chief deputy. Afflicted with a delicate health and inclined to sadness, he was nevertheless one of the most joyful poets of his time, singing the wine he could not drink and brightening his refrains with names of desserts which his stomach almost forbade him to touch. The ease of his verse had him nicknamed "the Panard of the XIXth ".

Gouffé was one of the first members of the dîners du Vaudeville. In 1806, with Pierre Capelle, he revived the defunct Caveau, by creating the Caveau moderne. This new goguette would exist until 1817.

He was a predecessor of Désaugiers and Béranger. Several of his songs were long popular as that which has for title and chorus Plus on est de fous, plus on rit.

He occasionally collaborated with the Journal des dames et des modes between 1800 and 1814

== Works ==
Theatre

- Cange, ou le Commissionnaire bienfaisant, trait historique in 1 act, with Pierre Villiers, Paris, Théâtre des Variétés, 31 October 1794
- Les Bustes, ou Arlequin sculpteur, comedy in 1 act and in prose, mingled with vaudevilles, with Pierre Villiers, Paris, Théâtre des Variétés, 7 March 1795
- Les Deux Jocrisses, ou le Commerce à l'eau, vaudeville in 1 act, Paris, Théâtre des Variétés, 3 January 1796
- Nicodème à Paris, ou la Décade et le Dimanche, vaudeville in 1 act, with J. Rouhier-Deschamps, Paris, Théâtre des Variétés, 24 January 1796
- Médard, fils de Gros-Jean, parodie d'Oscar, fils d'Ossian, in 2 acts, Paris, Théâtre des Variétés, 23 June 1796
- Nicaise, opéra comique in 1 act, arranged with arias, music by Jean-Joseph Vadé, Paris, Théâtre des Variétés, 27 June 1796
- Coco-Ricco, folie-vaudeville in 1 act, Paris, Théâtre d'Émulation, 14 April 1797
- La Nouvelle cacophonie, ou Faites donc aussi la paix, impromptu pacifique in 1 act, Paris, Théâtre des Variétés, 4 May 1797
- Le Dîner d'un héros, trait historique in 1 act, in prose, extravaganza, music, songs and dances, with J. Rouhier-Deschamps, Paris, Théâtre des Variétés, 24 January 1798
- Le Chaudronnier de Saint-Flour, comedy in 1 act, mingled with vaudevilles, with Louis-Marin Henriquez, Paris, Théâtre Louvois, 20 May 1798
- Clément Marot, vaudeville anecdotique in 1 act, with Georges Duval, Paris, Théâtre des Troubadours, 8 May 1799
- Le Val-de-Vire, ou le Berceau du vaudeville, divertissement in 1 act and in prose, mingled with vaudevilles, with Georges Duval, Paris, Théâtre des Troubadours, 7 June 1799
- Gilles aéronaute, ou l'Amérique n'est pas loin, comédie-parade, in 1 act, mingled with vaudevilles, with Jean-Michel-Pascal Buhan and Noël Aubin, Paris, Théâtre du Vaudeville, 24 July 1799
- Piron à Beaune, ânerie anecdotique in 1 act and in prose, mingled with vaudevilles, with Georges Duval, Paris, Théâtre des Troubadours, 26 August 1799
- Vadé à la Grenouillère, folie poissarde in 1 act and in prose, mingled with vaudevilles, with Georges Duval, Paris, Théâtre des Troubadours, 9 September 1799
- La Journée de Saint-Cloud, ou le 19 Brumaire, divertissement-vaudeville in 1 act and in prose, with François-Pierre-Auguste Léger and René de Chazet, Paris, Théâtre des Troubadours, 14 November 1799
- Garrick double, ou les Deux acteurs anglais, comedy in 1 act and in prose mingled with vaudevilles, with Georges Duval, Paris, Théâtre des Troubadours, 14 February 1800
- Cri-cri, ou le Mitron de la rue de l'Ourcine, folie-grivoise in 1 act and in vaudevilles, with Georges Duval, Paris, Théâtre des Variétés, 25 November 1800
- La Revue de l'an huit, suite de la Revue de l'an six, comédie-vaudeville in 1 act, with Michel Dieulafoy and René de Chazet, Paris, Théâtre du Vaudeville, 28 November 1800
- Philippe le Savoyard, ou l'Origine des ponts-neufs, divertissement in 1 act and in prose mingled with vaudevilles, with René de Chazet and Georges Duval, Paris, Théâtre du Vaudeville, 5 January 1801
- M. Seringa, ou la Fleur des apothicaires, parade in 1 act and in prose, mingled with vaudevilles, with Georges Duval, Paris, théâtre des Variétés, 31 May 1802
- Marmontel, comedy in 1 act, in prose, mingled with vaudevilles, with Tournay and Pierre-Ange Vieillard, Paris, Théâtre du Vaudeville, 23 August 1802
- Clémence-Isaure, ou les Jeux floraux, divertissement in 1 act and in prose mingled with vaudevilles, with Georges Duval, Paris, Théâtre du Vaudeville, 23 June 1803
- Le Médecin turc, opéra-bouffon in 1 act, with Pierre Villiers, music by Nicolas Isouard, Paris, Théâtre de l'Opéra-Comique, 19 November 1803
- Cassandre-Agamemnon et Colombine-Cassandre, parody of Agamemnon, in 1 act, in prose, mingled with vaudevilles, with Desfontaines-Lavallée and Pierre-Yves Barré, Paris, Théâtre du Vaudeville, 2 December 1803
- Les Pépinières de Vitry, ou le Premier de mai, divertissement in 1 act, in prose, mingled with vaudevilles, with Jean-Baptiste Radet, Paris, Théâtre du Vaudeville, 1 May 1804
- Le Bouffe et le Tailleur, opéra-bouffon in 1 act, with Pierre Villiers, music by Pierre Gaveaux, Paris, Théâtre des Variétés, 21 June 1804
- L'Intrigue dans la hotte, vaudeville in 1 act, with Antoine Simonnin, Paris, Théâtre des Variétés, 8 February 1806
- Rodomont, ou le Petit Don Quichotte, melodrama héroï-comique in 3 acts, with Pierre Villiers and Nicolas Brazier, Paris, Théâtre de la Gaîté, 7 March 1807
- Le Mariage de Charles Collé, ou la Tête à perruque, vaudeville n 1 act, with Nicolas Brazier and Antoine Simonnin, Paris, Théâtre des Variétés, 18 October 1809
- Le Valet sans maître, ou la Comédie sans dénouement, bluette in less than 1 act, in prose, mingled with couplets, with Pierre Villiers, Paris, Théâtre des Variétés, 28 July 1810
- Qui l'aura ? ou l'Impromptu de village, divertissement presented to H.R.H. the Duke of Gaëte, ministre des Finances, le jour de la fête de Mme Marie Hévin, 15 August 1813
- M. Beldam, ou la Femme sans le vouloir, comedy i1 act, mingled with vaudevilles, with Pierre Villiers, Paris, Théâtre des Variétés, 25 September 1816
- M. Mouton, ou la Journée mystérieuse, vaudeville in 1 act, with Paul de Kock, Paris, Théâtre de la Gaîté, 1 October 1818
- Le Duel et le déjeuner, ou les Comédiens joués, comédie-anecdote in 1 act and in prose, mingled with couplets, with Paul Ledoux, Paris, Théâtre des Variétés, 22 September 1818
- Le Retour à Valenciennes, ou Rentrons chez nous, vaudeville in 1 act, with Gabriel-Alexandre Belle, Paris, Théâtre de la Porte-Saint-Martin, 1 December 1818
- La Tante et la nièce, ou C'était moi, comédie-vaudeville in 1 act, with Gabriel-Alexandre Belle, Paris, Théâtre de la Gaîté, 16 July 1824

Songs and poems

- Ballon d'essai, ou Chansons et autres poésies, 1802
- Encore un ballon, ou Chansons et autres poésies nouvelles, 1807
- Le Dernier ballon, ou Recueil de chansons et autres poésies nouvelles, 1812
- La Goguette, chansonnier de table et de société, with Pierre-Jean de Béranger and Marc-Antoine Désaugiers, 1834
- Armand Gouffé et les tonneliers de Beaune, collection of poems, 1885

Varia

- L'Esprit du Caveau, ou Choix de chansons et pièces fugitives de Collé, Piron, Gallet, Favart, L'Attaignant, etc., précédé d'une notice historique par Armand Gouffé, 2 vol., 1805
- Correspondence with Joseph Sirven, 1886

== Sources ==
- Armand Gouffé on Wikisource
- Gustave Vapereau, Dictionnaire universel des littératures, Paris, Hachette, 1876, p. 914.
