= Antoine-Marie Coupart =

French playwright (1780–1864)

- Born: 13 June 1780; Paris
- Died: 19 October 1864 (aged 84); Paris
- Occupations: Playwright, chansonnier

Antoine-Marie Coupart (13 June 1780 – 19 October 1864) was an early 19th-century French playwright and chansonnier, as well as a dramaturge at the Théâtre du Palais Royal (1831–1864).

== Biography ==
At first an employee in the administration of military transport in Paris and Liège (1796–1798), he joined then the office of newspapers and theaters and the Ministry of Police where he became deputy chief in 1813. He worked with the same title at the Ministry of the interior in 1820 and became head of that office in 1824. After he was put on retirement in 1829, he worked as secretary general of the Paris Opera.

From 1822 to 1836, he was responsible for the publication of the Almanach des spectacles (twelve volumes).

His plays were presented at the Théâtre des Variétés and at the Théâtre de l'Ambigu-Comique in Paris.

== Works ==
- 1803: Lucile ou l'amant à l'épreuve, comedy in 1 act and in prose
- 1804: Toujours le même, vaudeville in 1 act, with Joseph Servières
- 1804: Les trois n'en font qu'un, vaudeville in 1 act, with Servières
- 1805: Les Nouvelles métamorphoses, vaudeville in 1 act and in prose, with Servières
- 1814: Vive la paix ! ou le Retour au village, impromptu in 1 act, mingled with songs and danses, with E. F. Varez
- 1815: Voilà notre bouquet ! ou le Cabinet littéraire, impromptu-vaudeville in 1 act, with Varez
- 1819: Le Passe-partout, comédie-vaudeville in 1 act, with Jean-Antoine-Marie Monperlier
- 1820: Levez la toile !, pièce épisodique in 1 act and in vaudevilles, with Jacquelin
- 1821: Le Baptême, ou la Double fête, vaudeville in 1 act
- 1822: Un trait de bienfaisance, ou la Fête d'un bon maire, à-propos in 1 act mingled with couplets, with Varez
- 1823: L'Aubergiste malgré lui, comédie proverbe, with Nicolas Brazier and Théodore Nézel
- 1823: Le Passage militaire, ou la Désertion par honneur, entertainment in 1 act, with Jacquelin
- 1823: Fête à la halle ! ou le Retour de nos braves, tableau épisodique in 1 act, with Jacquelin
- 1824: La fête d'automne, tableau villageois in 1 act, with Jacquelin and Varez
- 1824: Le Retour d'un brave, vaudeville in 1 act, with Jacquelin and Varez
- 1825: L'Entrée à Reims, entertainment in 1 act, with Jacques-André Jacquelin and Armand Joseph Overnay
- 1825: Le Petit postillon de Fimes, ou Deux fêtes pour une, à propos historique in 1 act, with Jacquelin
- 1826: Le Fils de l'invalide, one-act play, mingled with couplets, with Jacquelin and Varez
- 1829: La comédie au château, one-act play mingled with couplets, with Jacquelin and Varez
- 1830: Chansons d'un employé mis à la retraite
- undated: Couplets chantés le 22 juillet 1827, à Soisy-sous-Étiolles, à l'occasion de la fête de Marguerite G
- undated: Souvenir du 11 juin 1842
- 1854: Couplets d'inauguration de la société de la Chopinette, fondée par les artistes du théâtre du Palais-Royal, chantés le 6 janvier 1855

== Bibliography ==
- François-Joseph Fétis, Biographie universelle des musiciens, vol.3-4, 1837, (p. 205) (Read online)
- Gustave Vapereau, L'année littéraire et dramatique, 1865, (p. 374)
- Gustave Vapereau, Dictionnaire universel des contemporains, 1865, (p. 435) (Read online)
- Ludovic Lalanne, Dictionnaire historique de la France, 1872, (p. 596) (Read online)
