= François-Pierre-Auguste Léger =

French playwright

François-Pierre-Auguste Léger (Bernay, Eure, 16 March 1766 – Paris, 28 March 1823) was an 18th–19th-century French playwright.

== Short biography ==
The son of a surgeon, he became a tutor for sons of the bourgeoisie then left teaching to join a troupe of actors at the theaters du Vaudeville (1790–1797) and des Troubadours (1797–1800). He played the roles of lovers and fools and also started writing, playing in the first plays he wrote such as L'Auteur d'un moment that made him known to the public. After seven years at the Vaudeville, it passed to the Troubadours of which he became deputy director until bankruptcy forced the theatre to closed down on 1 March 1800.

After he became a teacher of literature and morality in a ladies boarding school (1801), he obtained a position of clerk of court in Saint-Denis but continued to have his plays presented at the Théâtre du Palais-Royal, the Théâtre des Variétés, the Théâtre-Français, the Théâtre de la Gaîté or the Théâtre de l'Odéon.

The First Restoration had him lose his position of registrar but he managed to find a post in the administration of revenue stamp before becoming theatre manager of the Théâtre de Nantes (1816–1818).

He died on 28 March 1823 in Paris, aged 57.

== Works ==
- 1790: Le Danger des conseils, ou la Folle inconstance, comedy in 1 act and in verse
- 1790: L'Orphelin et le curé, historical fact, in 1 act and in prose
- 1790: La Folle gageure, comedy in 1 act and in prose
- 1792: Alain et Rosette, one-act comédie en vaudevilles
- 1792: L'Apothéose du jeune Barra, one-act tableau patriotique, mingled with ariettes, with Louis Emmanuel Jadin
- 1792: L'Auteur d'un moment, one-act comedy, in verse and in vaudevilles
- 1792: La Cinquantaine, one-act comedy in prose and in vaudeville
- 1792: L'isle des femmes, divertissement in 1 act and in vaudevilles
- 1792: Joconde, comedy in 2 acts and in vaudevilles
- 1793: L'Heureuse décade, divertissement patriotique, in i act and in vaudevilles, with Pierre-Yves Barré and Jean-René Rosières
- 1793: Nicaise, peintre, opéra comique in one act and in prose
- 1793: Le Dédit mal gardé, divertissement patriotique in 1 act, in prose and in vaudevilles, with Louis Philipon de La Madelaine
- 1793: La Gageure inutile ou Plus de peur que de mal, one-act comedy
- 1793: Georges et Gros-Jean, ou l'Enfant trouvé, historical fact, in 1 act and in vaudevilles
- 1793: La Papesse Jeanne, one-act comedy
- 1794: Christophe Dubois, historical fact in 1 act and in prose, mingled with vaudevilles
- 1795: Le Sourd guéri, ou Les tu et les vous, one-act comedy, mingled with vaudevilles, with Barré
- 1796: Angélique et Melcour, ou le Procès, one-act comedy
- 1796: Ziste et zeste, ou les Importuns, folie in 1 act and in vaudevilles, with Jean-François Cailhava de L'Estandoux
- 1797: Belle et bonne ou les Deux soeurs, one-act comedy
- 1798: Le Déménagement du Salon ou le Portrait de Gilles, comédie-parade in 1 act and in vaudevilles, with Noël Aubin, René de Chazet and Emmanuel Dupaty
- 1798: L'Homme sans façon, ou le Vieux cousin, comedy in 3 acts and in verse
- 1799: La Journée de Saint-Cloud, ou Le dix-neuf brumaire, divertissement-vaudeville in 1 act and in prose, with de Chazet and Armand Gouffé
- 1799: Il faut un état, ou La revue de l'an six, proverbe in 1 act, in prose and in vaudevilles, with Jean-Michel-Pascal Buhan and de Chazet
- 1800: La Clef forée, ou la 1re représentation, one-act anecdote in vaudevilles, with Auguste Creuzé de Lesser
- 1801: Le Vieux major, vaudeville in 1 act and in prose, with René Charles Guilbert de Pixérécourt
- 1802: Les Aveugles mendiants ou Partie et revanche, one-act vaudeville anecdotique
- 1802: Un Tour de jeune homme, anecdote in 1 act and in prose, with de Chazet
- 1803: Rhétorique épistolaire, ou Principaux élémens de l'art oratoire appliqués au genre épistolaire, suivis d'un traité succint sur la manière de lire et de réciter à haute voix
- 1804: Henri de Bavière, opéra en 3 actes, with Antoine-Pierre Dutramblay
- 1804: Bombarde, ou les Marchands de chansons, parody of Ossian, ou les Bardes , five-act lyrical melodrama, with Joseph Servières
- 1804: Un Quart-d'heure d'un sage, one-act comedy, mingled with vaudevilles, with Servières
- 1805: Le Billet de logement, one-act comedy, mingled with vaudevilles
- 1806: La Belle hôtesse, one-act comedy, mingled with vaudevilles, with de Chazet
- 1811: Le Billet de loterie, one-act comedy, with de Chazet
- 1816: Henri IV à Billière, two-act comedy in verse
- 1817: Maria, ou la Demoiselle de compagnie, comedy in 1 act and in verse
- 1818: John Bull, ou Voyage à l'île des chimères
- 1819: Macédoine, ou Poésies et chansons érotiques, badines et grivoises, Béchet aîné
- 1819: M. Partout, ou le Dîner manqué, one-act tableau-vaudeville
- 1821: Un Dimanche à Passy, ou M. Partout, one-act tableau-vaudeville, with de Chazet and Marc-Antoine Désaugiers
- 1821: Le Fruit défendu, comédie en vaudeville in 1 act, with Gabriel-Alexandre Belle

== Bibliography ==
- Charles Ménétrier, Galerie historique des comédiens de la troupe de Nicolet, 1869, (p. 212-217)
- Ludovic Lalanne, Dictionnaire historique de la France, 1877, (p. 1113)
- Henry Lyonnet, Dictionnaire des comédiens français, 1911
