= Jean-Michel-Pascal Buhan =

- Born: 17 April 1770; Bordeaux
- Died: 24 February 1822 (aged 51); Bordeaux
- Occupations: Writer, polemist

Jean (or Joseph)-Michel-Pascal Buhan (17 April 1770 – 24 February 1822) was an 18th-century French lawyer, poet, polemist and playwright.

== Biography ==
The son of a lawyer, trustee prosecutor of Bordeaux, he became himself a lawyer in his hometown and began to plead in 1792. In March 1793, he decided to engage in the Vendee armies in a volunteer battalion from Gironde and there became general Boulard's aide. Suffering from significant sight difficulties, he joined the administration in charge of military transport and army convoys in the western Pyrenees.

As one of the propagators of the resistance in the Midi departments, he was outlawed at the convention for the defense of the Girondins. After the Fall of Robespierre, he moved to Paris in the Minister of Defence as chief of correspondence. Thanks to various encounters he made in that position, he launched into literature. He left a few comedies and poems published in papers as well as polemical works.

After the Coup of 18 Brumaire, he became a lawyer in Bordeaux in 1811, was part of the Customs Court. Censor and President of the Bar association (1821), he died in Bordeaux February 24, 1822.

Leaving behind four children he had with his niece he had married in need, his friends managed to get to his widow a pension of 1,200Frs for his actions in favor of the First Restoration.

== Works ==
- 1790: Lettre des administrateurs du directoire du département de la Gironde
- 1796: Revue des auteurs vivants grands et petits, coup d’œil sur la république des lettres en France, 6e année de la République française, par un Impartial, s'il en est
- 1797: Il faut un état, ou La revue de l'an six, proverbe in 1 act, in prose and in vaudevilles, with René de Chazet and François-Pierre-Auguste Léger
- 1799: Gilles aéronaute, comedy in 1 act and 2 parts, with Armand Gouffé and Noël Aubin
- 1800: Réflexions sur l'étude de la législation, et sur la meilleure manière d'enseigner cette science

== Bibliography ==
- Nicolas Le Moyne des Essarts, Les siècles littéraires de la France, 1801, (p. 99)
- Louis-Gabriel Michaud, Biographie universelle ancienne et moderne, Tome 59, supplément, BOR-CAL, 1835, (p. 420-421)
- Ludovic Lalanne, Dictionnaire historique de la France, 1872, (p. 402)
