= Antoine-Denis Chaudet =

French sculptor (1763–1810)

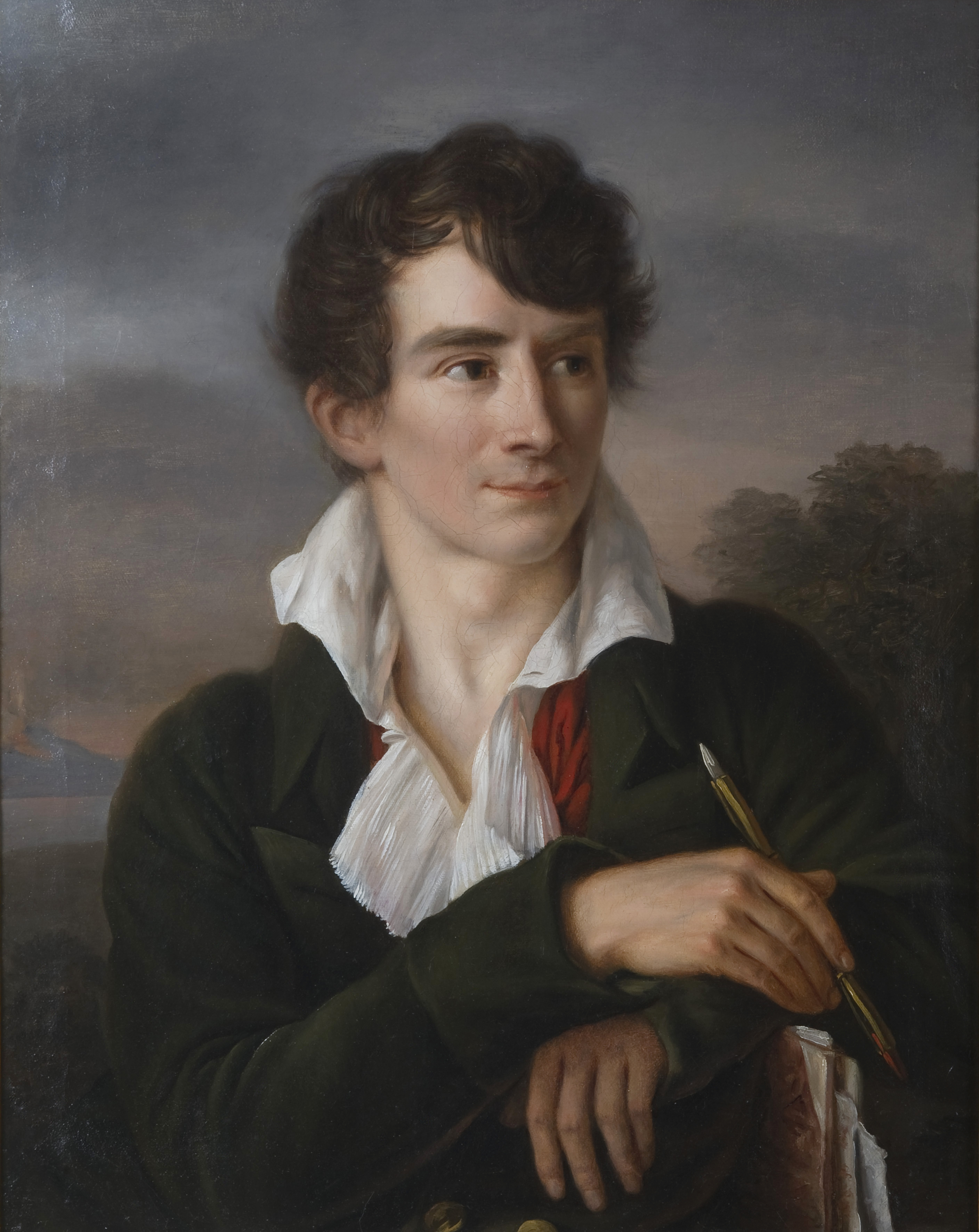
- Portrait of Chaudet by his wife Jeanne-Elisabeth Chaudet, c. 1802
- Born: 3 March 1763; Paris, France
- Died: 19 April 1810 (aged 47); Paris, France
- Occupation: Sculptor
- Spouse: Jeanne-Elisabeth Chaudet

Antoine-Denis Chaudet (French pronunciation: [ɑ̃twan dəni ʃodɛ]; 3 March 1763 – 19 April 1810) was a French sculptor who worked in the neoclassical style. He was born and died in Paris.

== Life and work ==
He began his artistic training as a student of Jean-Baptiste Stouf at the Royal Academy of Painting and Sculpture. In 1784 his bas-relief, Joseph Sold into Slavery by His Brothers, was awarded the Prix-de-Rome. This enabled him to study at the French Academy in Rome, where he spent four years studying ancient sculpture.

On his return to France in 1789, he was admitted to the Royal Academy of Painting and Sculpture. In 1801 he took part in illustrating an edition of the collected works of Jean Racine, published by Firmin Didot. Most of these were Biblical scenes. Around that same time, he married one of his students, Jeanne-Elisabeth Gabiou. He also collaborated with Pierre-François-Léonard Fontaine and Charles Percier on architectural projects.

In 1805, he became a member of the Institute of France. In February 1810, he took the post of Professor-Rector at the École des Beaux-Arts, replacing Louis-Jean-François Lagrenée, who had died several years before. He died himself, only two months later. He was interred at the Montparnasse Cemetery. The Louvre holds collections of his sketches and manuscript notes.

In 1812, Napoleon transported Chaudet's marble statue of him to Moscow, to install it in a prominent place there. It is currently on display at the Borodino Panorama Museum.

== Notable works ==
- Peace (Pax, c. 1800 - 1810)
- Busts of Emperor Napoleon and Empress Joséphine (exhibited 1811)
- L'Amour (Cupid and the Butterfly), completed posthumously by Pierre Cartellier (1817), (Louvre Museum)
- Joseph Sold Into Slavery by his Brothers (bas-relief, (1784)
- The infant Oedipus and Phorbas (1799). Shown at the Salon of 1801, it was completed by Pierre Cartellier (1757–1831) and Louis Dupaty (1771–1825) after Chaudet's death.

== Gallery ==
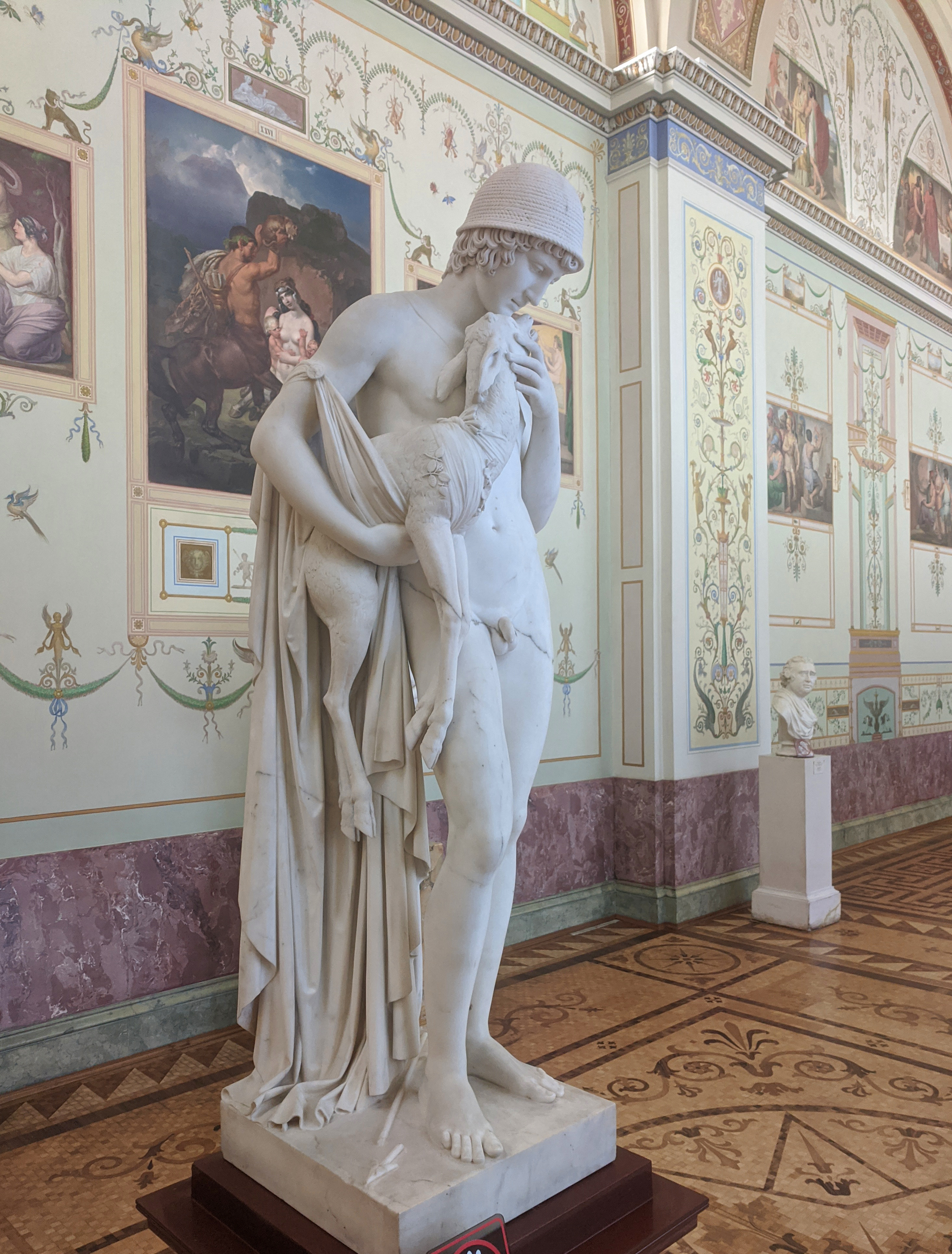
Cyparissus mourns
his stag

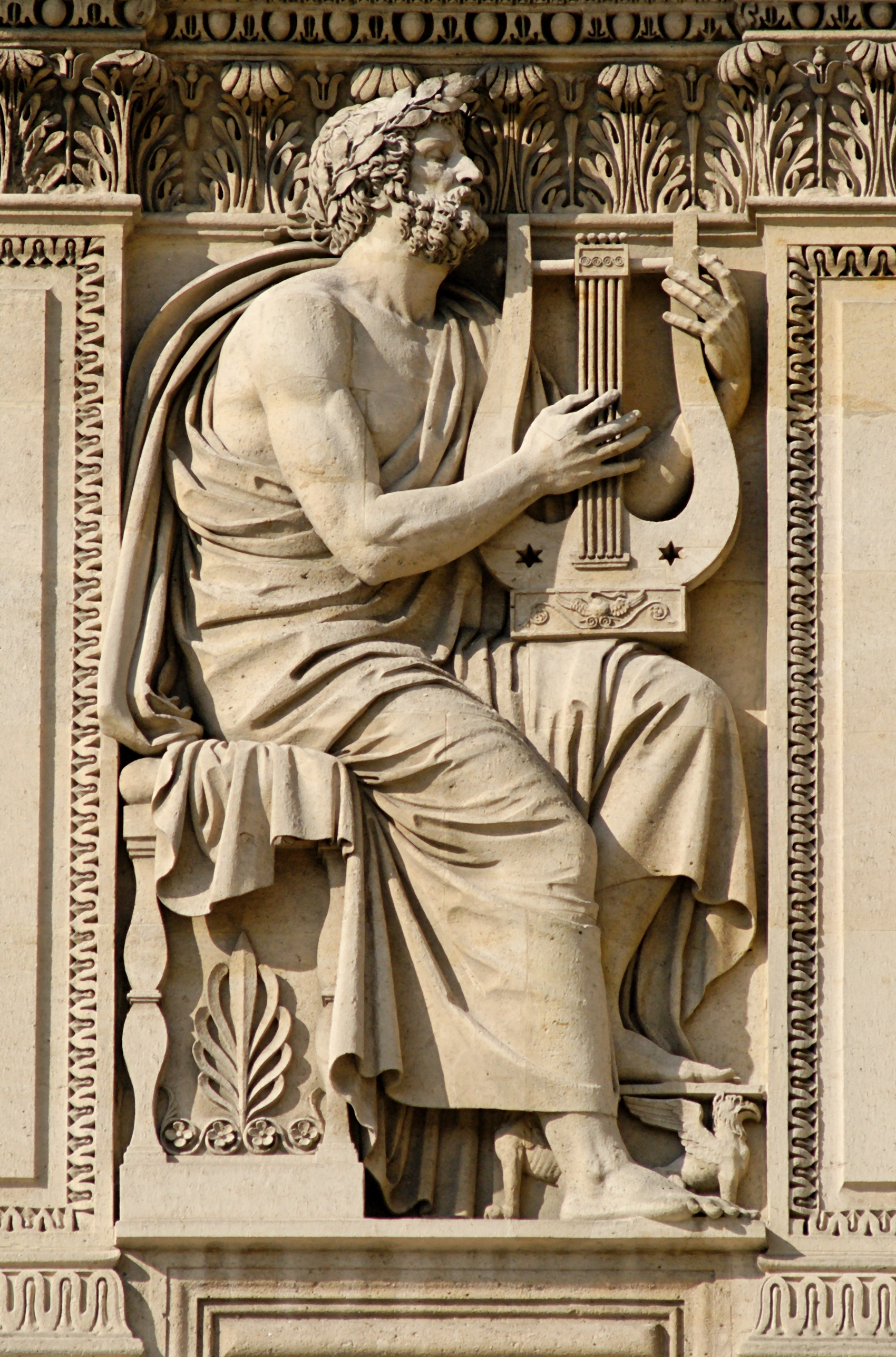
The poet Homer

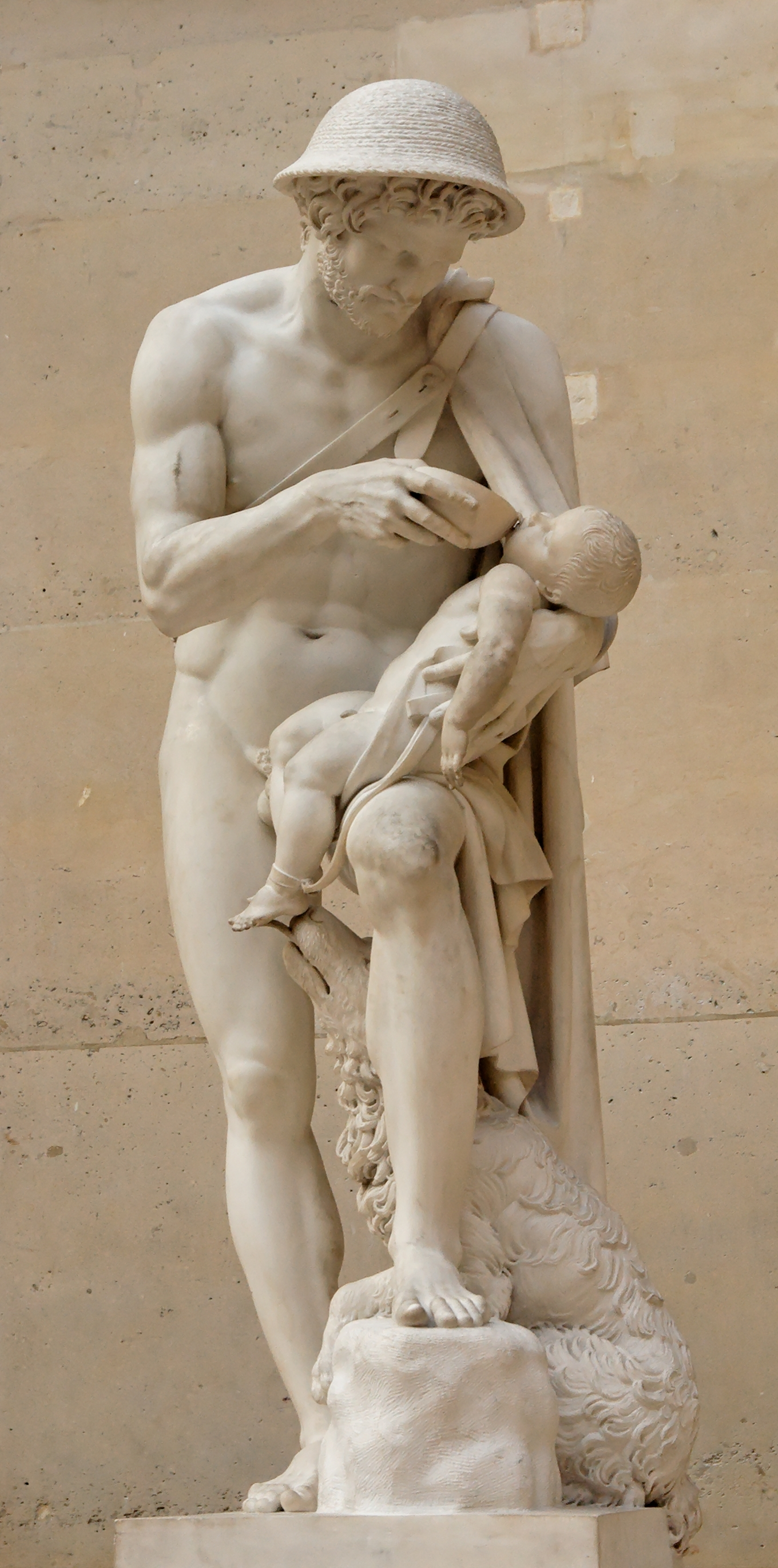
Oedipus brought to life by Phorbas

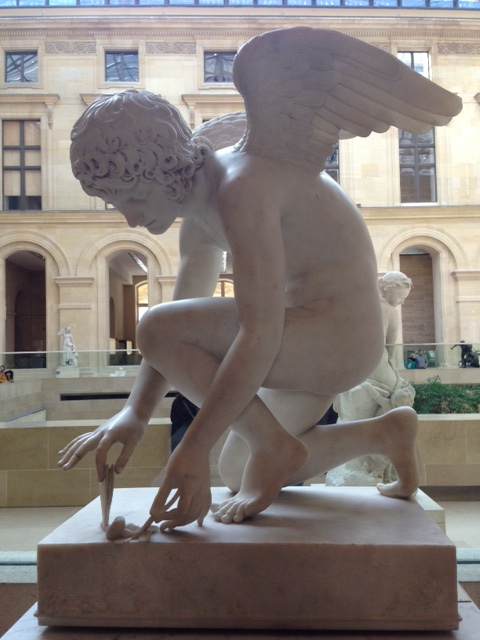
Cupid catching a butterfly

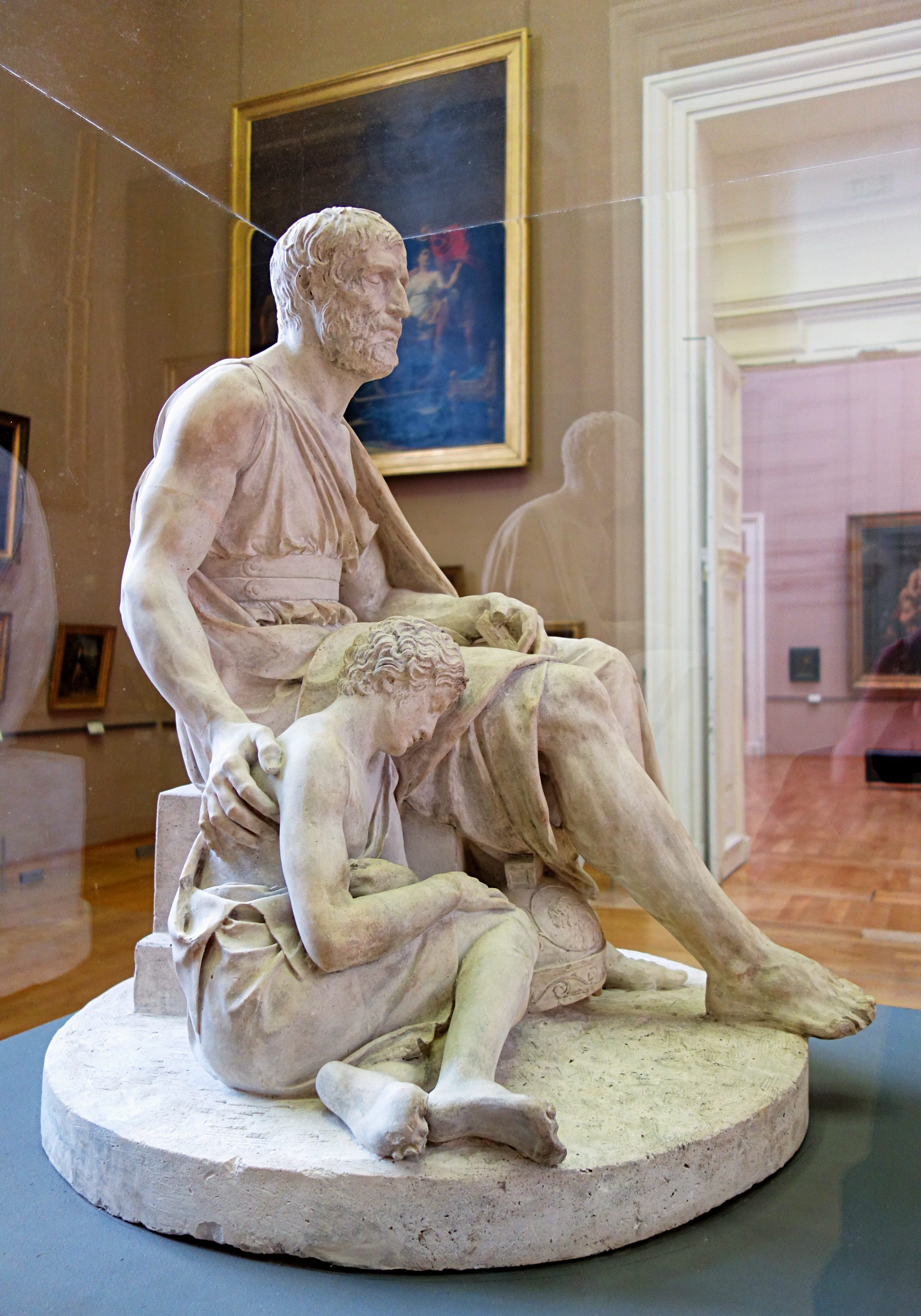
Blind Belisarius, resting

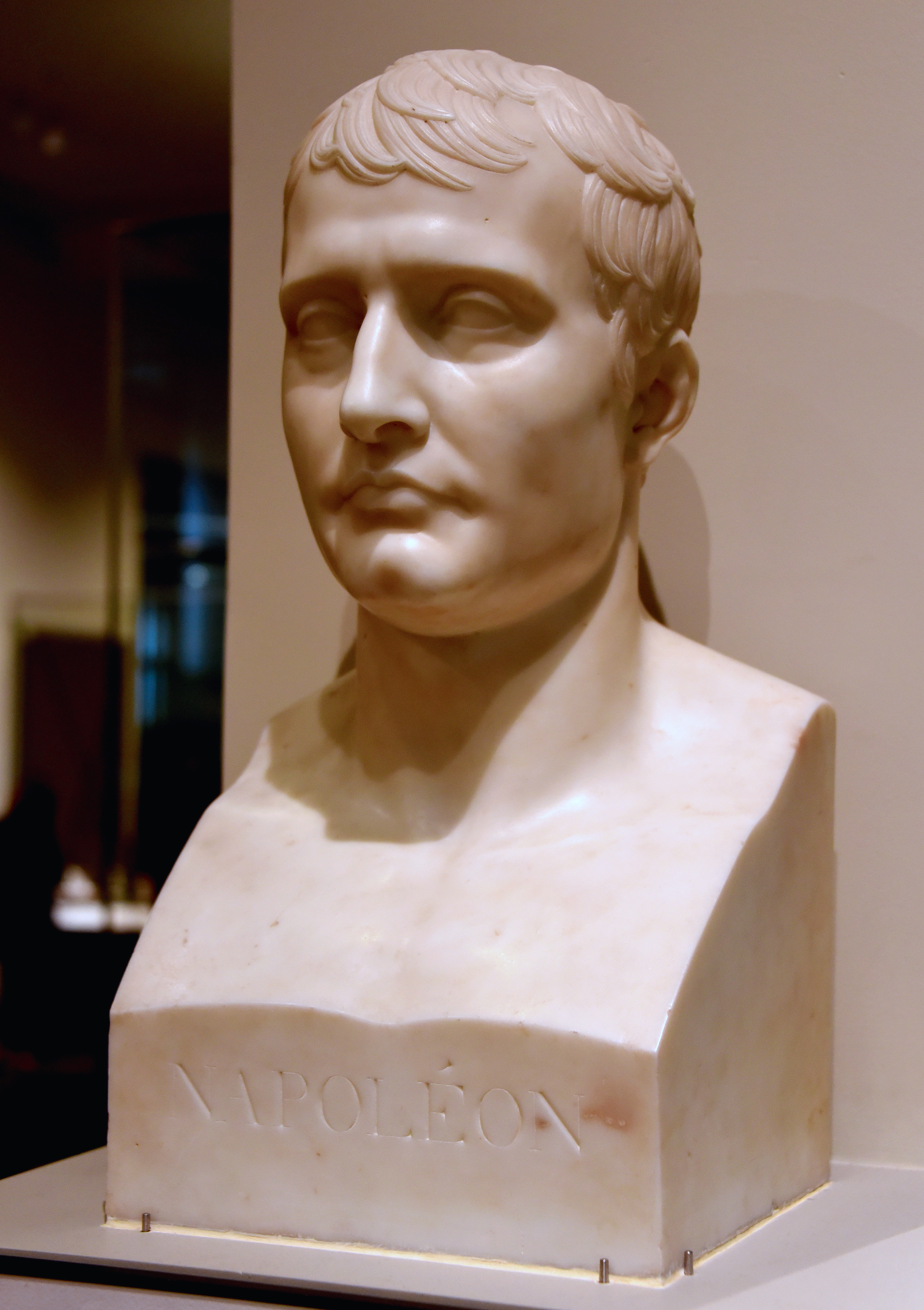
Bust of Napoleon

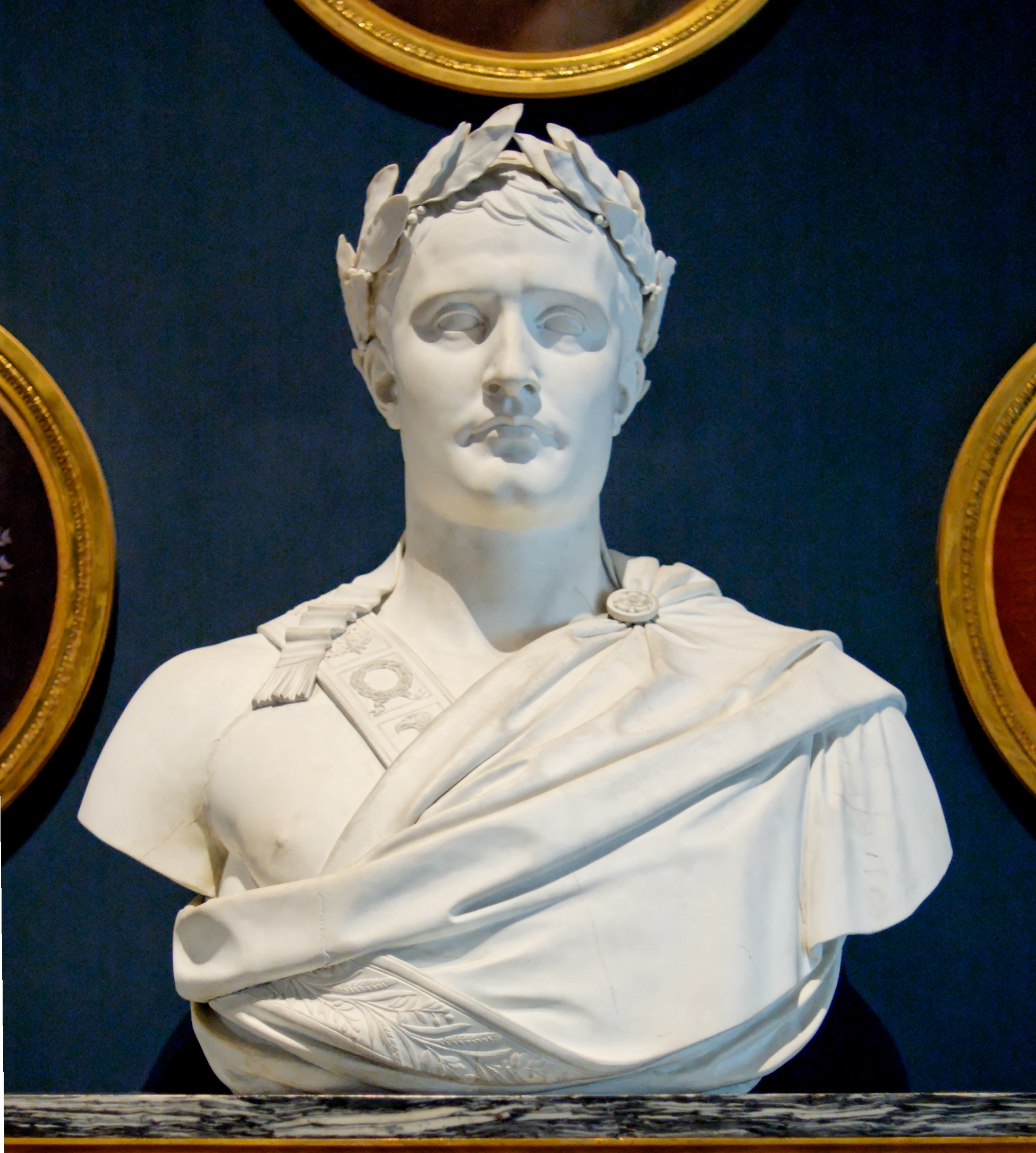
Napoleon in porcelain

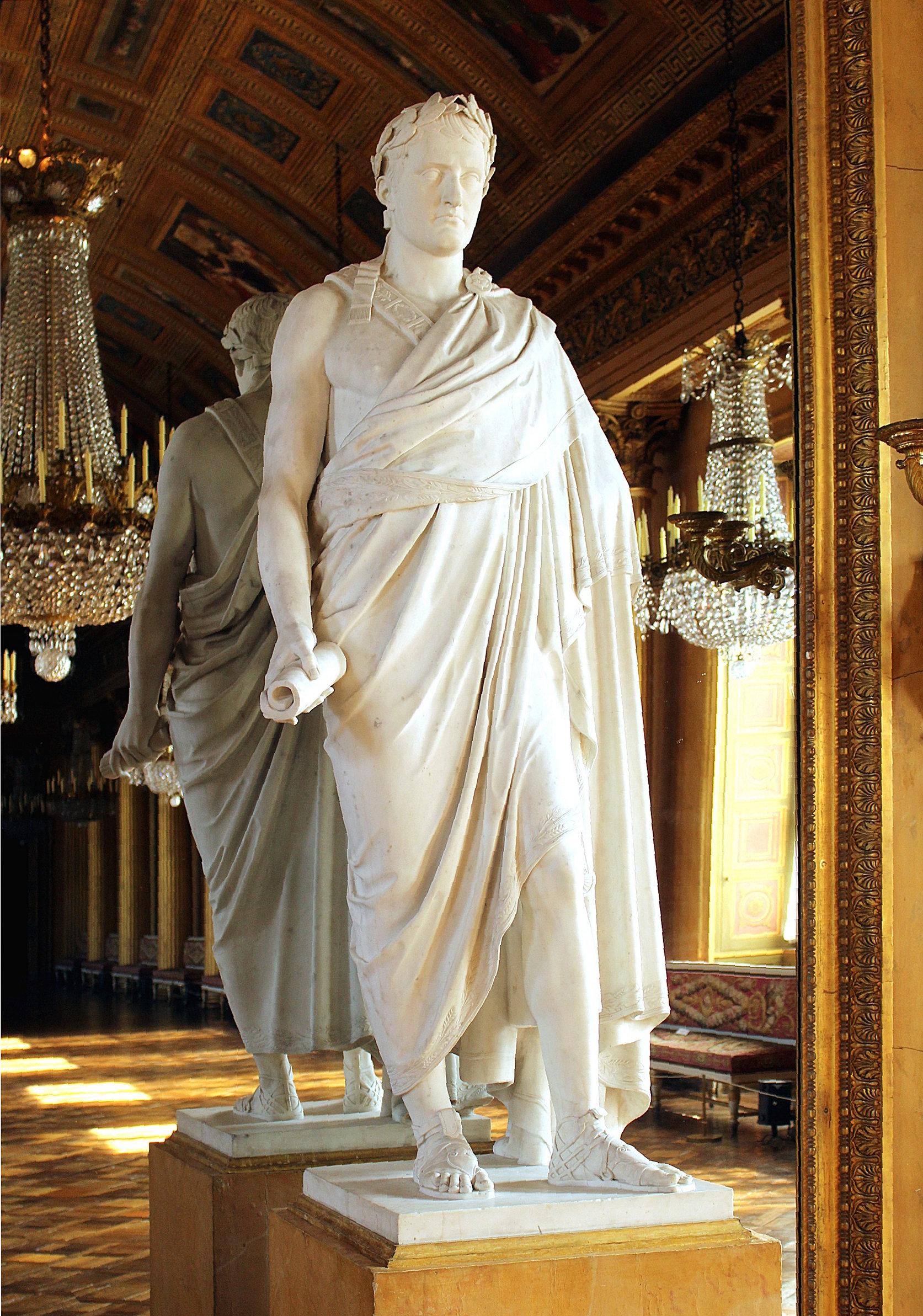
Statue of Napoleon

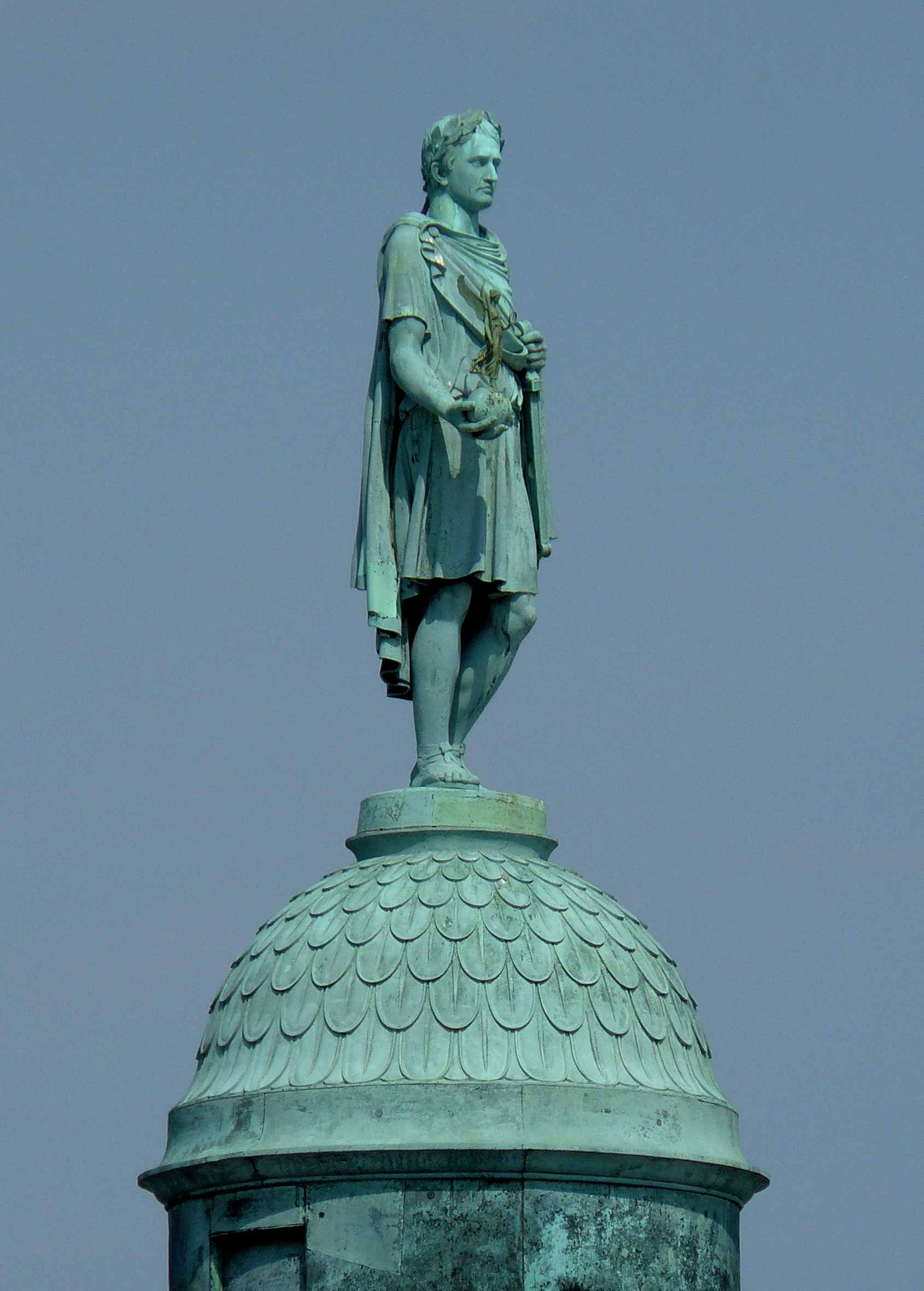
Napoleon as
Julius Caesar

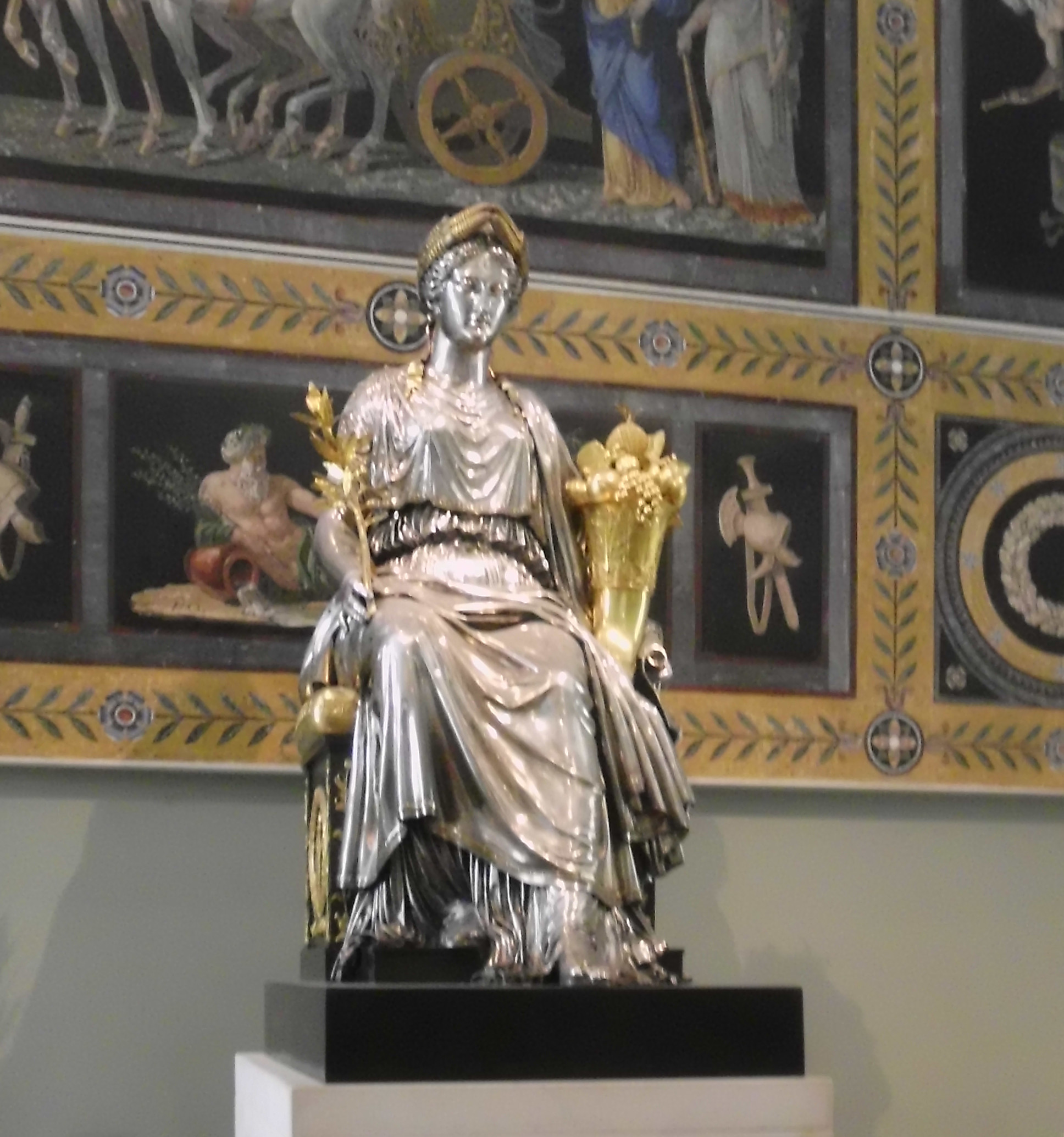
The goddess Pax
