= Charles-François Panard =

French poet and playwright

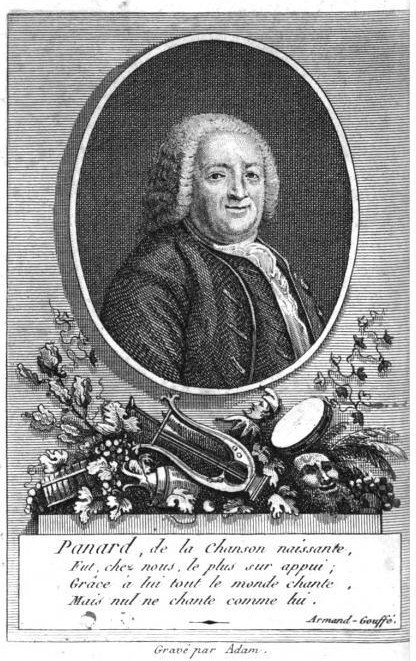
- Born: 2 November 1689; Courville-sur-Eure, France
- Died: 13 March 1765 (aged 75); Paris, France
- Occupations: Chansonnier; Playwright; Poet

Charles-François Panard, or Pannard, (2 November 1689 – 13 June 1765) was an 18th-century French poet, chansonnier, playwright and goguettier.

== Selected works ==
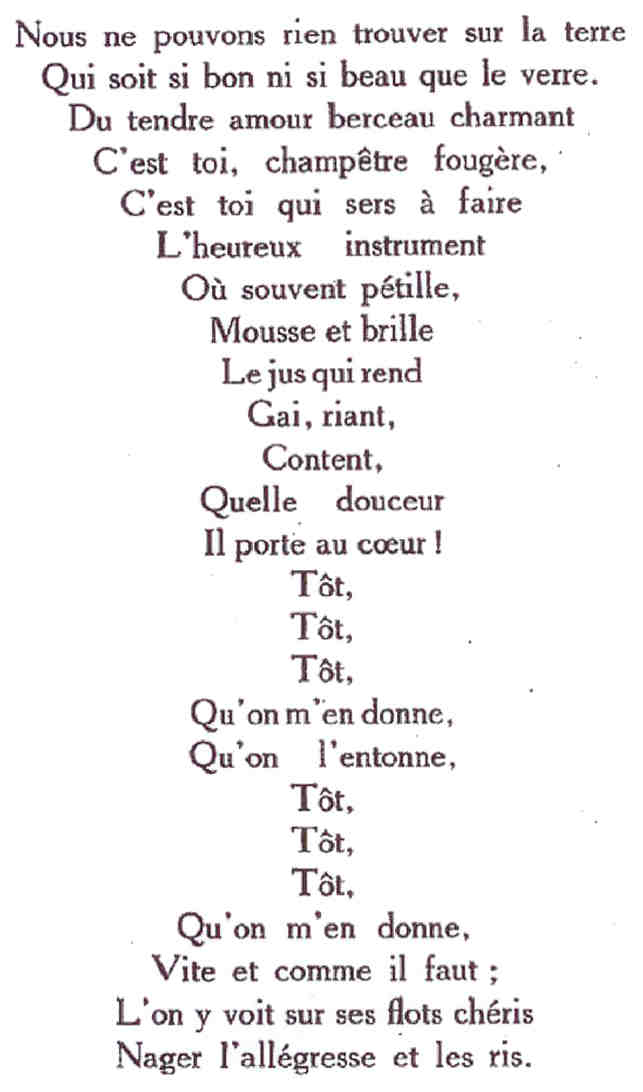
upright=1Shaped poem by Panard

- 1731: Le Tour de Carnaval, comedy in 1 act and in prose
- 1737: Les Acteurs déplacés, comédy in 1 act and in prose
- 1744: Les Fêtes sincères et l'heureux retour, comedy in 1 act in free verse
- 1744: Pygmalion, one-act opéra comique
- 1744: Roland, one-act opéra comique
- 1746: Le Magasin des modernes, one-act opéra comique
- 1747: L'Impromotu des acteurs, comedy in 1 act in free verse
- 1747: Les Tableaux, comedy in 1 act in free verse
- 1754: Zéphir et Fleurette, one-act opéra-comique, with Pierre Laujon and Charles-Simon Favart, (parody of Zélindor by François-Augustin de Paradis de Moncrif)
- 1757: Le Nouvelliste dupé, one-act opéra comique
- 1762: L'Écosseuse, one-act opéra comique, with Louis Anseaume, (parody of L'Écossaise by Voltaire)

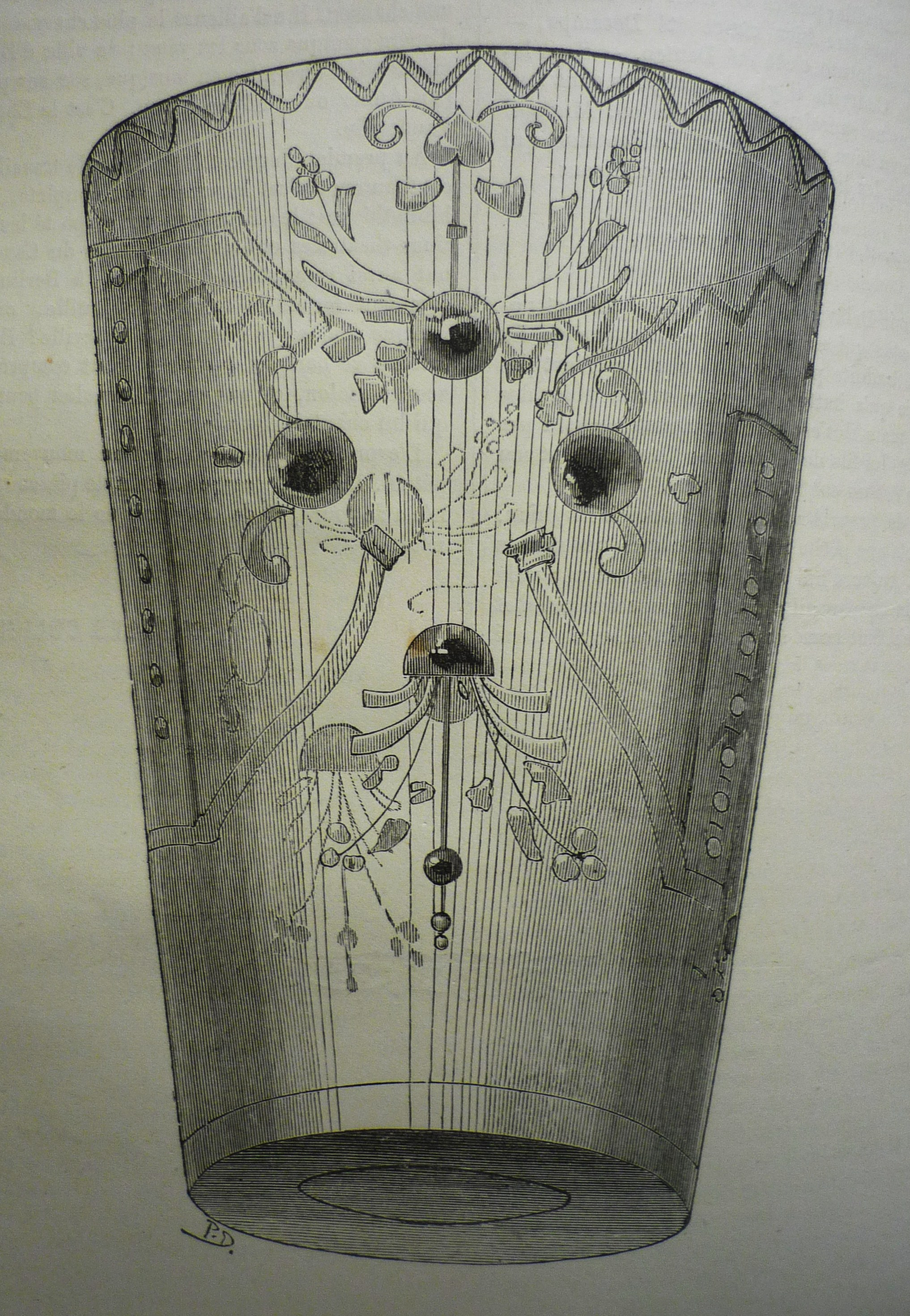
Panard's glass, iconic relic of the Société du Caveau

== See also ==
- Calligram

== Bibliography ==
- Armand Gouffé, Notice sur Panard, en tête de l'édition des Œuvres choisies, 1803, 3 vol. in-18
- E. Junge, Pannard, Leipzig, 1901
- Marandet, Manuscrits inédits de la famille Favart, de Fuzelier, de Pannard, 1922
- Rizzoni, Nathalie, Charles-François Pannard et l'esthétique du petit, Oxford, Voltaire Foundation, SVEC 2000:01.

== Sources ==
- Gustave Vapereau, Dictionnaire universel des littératures, Paris, Hachette, 1876.
- Maurice Allem, Anthologie poétique française, XVIIIe siècle, Paris, Garnier Frères, 1919
- Cardinal Georges Grente (dir.), Dictionnaire des lettres françaises. Le XVIIIe siècle, nouvelle édition revue et mise à jour sous la direction de François Moureau, Paris, Fayard, 1995, (p. 999-1000).
- Charles-François Panard on Wikisource
