= Jean Berrier =

French poet, playwright and journalist

Jean-François-Constant Berrier (1766, Aire-en-Artois – 12 June 1824, Paris) was an 18th–19th-century French poet, playwright and journalist.

Berrier was twenty-five years old when the French Revolution broke out. He was always opposed to its excesses, and had the chance, during the Reign of Terror, to find refuge in the camps against the ban, successively filling the functions of chief agent of food supply, in the army of Kellermann and that of Schérer, in Italy.

The moderation of his opinions, his humanity, meant that those persecuted by the various revolutionary factions found an asylum in his administration. This conduct, denounced to the dislike of Jacobins by the Journal des Hommes libres, forced Berrier to leave office. Later, under Napoleon, he worked for the Deventeaux Maubreuil food company, but having been denounced as having taken part in some royalist intrigues, he was arrested and remained in prison for several months. He left these military supplies impoverished, where so many others have made great fortunes.

After 1814, he joined the Gazette de France as translator of English newspapers. From 1820 to 1822, he could add to this obscure work the salary of a small employment in the prefecture offices, a job he got by protecting his friend Morin, a former military employee like him, and who was then head of division to the general direction of Police.

In 1824, Berrier competed at "Société des Bonnes-Lettres" on the issue of The Benefits of legitimacy. His speech won an honorable mention but was not printed. He left two son, one of which, distinguished poet known as Constant Berrier, became chief clerk at the Ministry of Education. The titles of his productions show that his muse was mostly inspired by political circumstances. He also contributed to some dramatic bluettes who had only mediocre success.

== Works ==
- 1810: Ode à LL. MM. II. et BB. Napoléon-le-Grand et Marie-Louise d’Autriche, in-8°;
- Stances à LL. MM. II. et Mi. sur la naissance du roi de Borne, in-8°;
- Le Livre du Destin, poème sur la naissance du roi de Home (dans les hommages poétiques à Napoléon);
- 1811: Le Dévouement de Malesherbes;
- 1822: La Restauration des Lettres et des Arts sous François Ier, ode qui a concouru pour le prix de poésie à l’Académie française;
- 1822: Les Médecins français et les Sœurs de Sainte-Camille à Barcelone;
- 1820: Le Mari confident, comédie en vaudeville, with Armand Overnay, presented at Théâtre de l'Ambigu-Comique 2 August. Paris, in-8°;
- 1822: L’Épicurien malgré lui, comédie en vaudeville in one act, with Armand Overnay, presented at Théâtre de la Porte-Saint-Martin 14 November, in-8°;
- 1823: Les Deux Lucas, with Armand Overnay, comédie en vaudeville in one act, représente at la Gaité 5 March. in-8°;
- 1824: Félix et Roger, one-act play mingled with couplets, with Armand Overnay and Hippolyte Levesque, presented at the same Theatre 2 February, in-8°.

== Sources ==
- Joseph François Michaud, Louis Gabriel Michaud, Biographie universelle, ancienne et moderne, Paris, A. T. Desplaces, 1843, (p. 111-2).
