= Gabriel-Alexandre Belle =

French writer and playwright (1782–1855)

- Born: 4 March 1782; Paris
- Died: 20 October 1855 (aged 73); Paris
- Occupations: Playwright, writer

Gabriel-Alexandre Belle (4 March 1782 – 20 October 1855) was a 19th-century French writer and playwright. Belle was honoured by being made a Chevalier of the Légion d'honneur.

== Biography ==
A former commissioner of war, a member of the Soupers de Momus, an editor at the La Nouveauté newspaper, Director of the magazine Discours prononcé à la séance publique de la Société académique des Enfans d'Apollon, his plays were presented on the most important Parisian stages of the 19th century: Théâtre de la Porte-Saint-Martin, Théâtre de la Gaîté, Théâtre du Vaudeville, Théâtre des Variétés etc.

== Works ==
- 1807: La paix ou l'heureux retour, vaudeville in 1 act, with Paul Ledoux
- 1811: Ode, stances et pot-pourri sur la naissance de S. M. le Roi de Rome
- 1817: Femme à vendre, ou le Marché écossais, folie in 1 act, mingled with vaudevilles, with Paul Gentilhomme
- 1818: Crillon et Bussy d'Amboise, historical fact in 1 act, mingled with couplets, with Gentilhomme
- 1818: M. Sans-Souci, ou le Peintre en prison, comedy in 1 act, mingled with couplets, with Paul Ledoux
- 1818: Le Retour à Valenciennes, ou Rentrons chez nous, vaudeville in 1 act, with Armand Gouffé
- 1818: Karabi, ou l'île des piqures, vaudeville, with Gouffé
- 1819: Le Hussard et le Tambour, vaudeville, with Petit-maitre
- 1820: Monsieur Fougères, ou le Peintre du Marché-aux-Fleurs, vaudeville, with Gouffé
- 1821: Le fruit défendu, one-act vaudeville, with François-Pierre-Auguste Léger
- 1821: Les Voleurs supposés, one-act comédie en vaudevilles , with W. Lafontaine and Mélesville
- 1821: Le Bureau des nourrices, folie in 1 act, mingled with couplets, with Frédéric Dupetit-Méré
- 1822: Amour et Caprice, vaudeville, with W. Lafontaine
- 1822: Les Dames Martin, ou le Mari, la femme et la veuve, one-act comédie en vaudevilles, with W. Lafontaine and Henri de Tully
- 1823: La Caserne, ou le Changement de garnison, tableau militaire in 1 act, mingled with couplets, with Paul Ledoux
- 1824: La Fille du commissaire, vaudeville, with B. Antier
- 1824: Le Roi René, ou la Provence au 15e siècle, two-act opéra comique, with Sewrin
- 1824: La Tante et la nièce, ou C'était moi, one-act comédie en vaudevilles, with Gouffé
- 1825: Le Point d'honneur, vaudeville in 1 act from the Contes by Adrien de Sarrasin, with Benjamin Antier
- 1828: La Circulaire, comedy in 1 act and in prose, with Jacques-André Jacquelin

== Bibliography ==
- Joseph-Marie Quérard, La littérature française contemporaine: XIXth century, vol.1, 1842, (p. 248-249)
- Paul Chéron, Catalogue général de la librairie française au XIXth century, 1856, (p. 713)
