= Louis-Marin Henriquez =

French writer and playwright (1765–1815)

Louis-Marin Henriquez (1765 – 1815) was an 18th-century French writer and playwright.

A professor of belles-lettres at the college of Blois, he wrote polemical articles in the Mercure de France and Épitres et évangiles du républicain, his most popular work.

== Works ==
- 1790: Je m'en fouts: liberté, libertas, foutre!
- 1791: Le Pape traité comme il le mérite, ou Réponse à la bulle de Pie V
- 1791: Le Diable à confesse
- 1793: Les Aventures de Jérôme Lecocq, ou les vices du despotisme et les avantages de la liberté
- 1794: Histoires et morales choisies, pour chaque mois de l'année républicaine, ouvrage destiné à l'instruction de la jeunesse
- 1794: Morale républicaine en conseils et en exemples, pour toutes les décades de l'année, à l'usage des jeunes sans-culottes
- 1794: Pensées républicaines pour chaque jour du mois
- 1795: Principes de civilité républicaine, dédiés à l'enfance et à la jeunesse
- 1798: Le Chaudronnier de Saint-Flour, comedy in one act, with Armand Gouffé
- 1798: Voyage et aventures de Frondeabus, fils d'Herschell, dans la cinquième partie du monde, ouvrage traduit de la langue herschellique
- 1798: Épîtres et évangiles du républicain pour toutes les décades de l'année, à l'usage des jeunes sans-culottes
- 1804: Les Grâces à confesse, poem in four chants, 1804
- undated: La Dépanthéonisation de J.-P. Marat, patron des hommes de sang et des terroristes (20 pluviôse), fondée sur ses crimes et sur les forfaits des jacobins

== Bibliography ==
- Louis Gabriel Michaud, Biographie universelle ancienne et moderne, vol.9, 1845, (p. 274)
- Camille Dreyfus, André Berthelot, La Grande encyclopédie: inventaire raisonné des sciences, des lettres et des arts, vol.19, 1886, (p. 1118)
- Gilbert Py, Rousseau et les éducateurs, 1997, (p. 467)
