= Charles Dupaty =

French sculptor

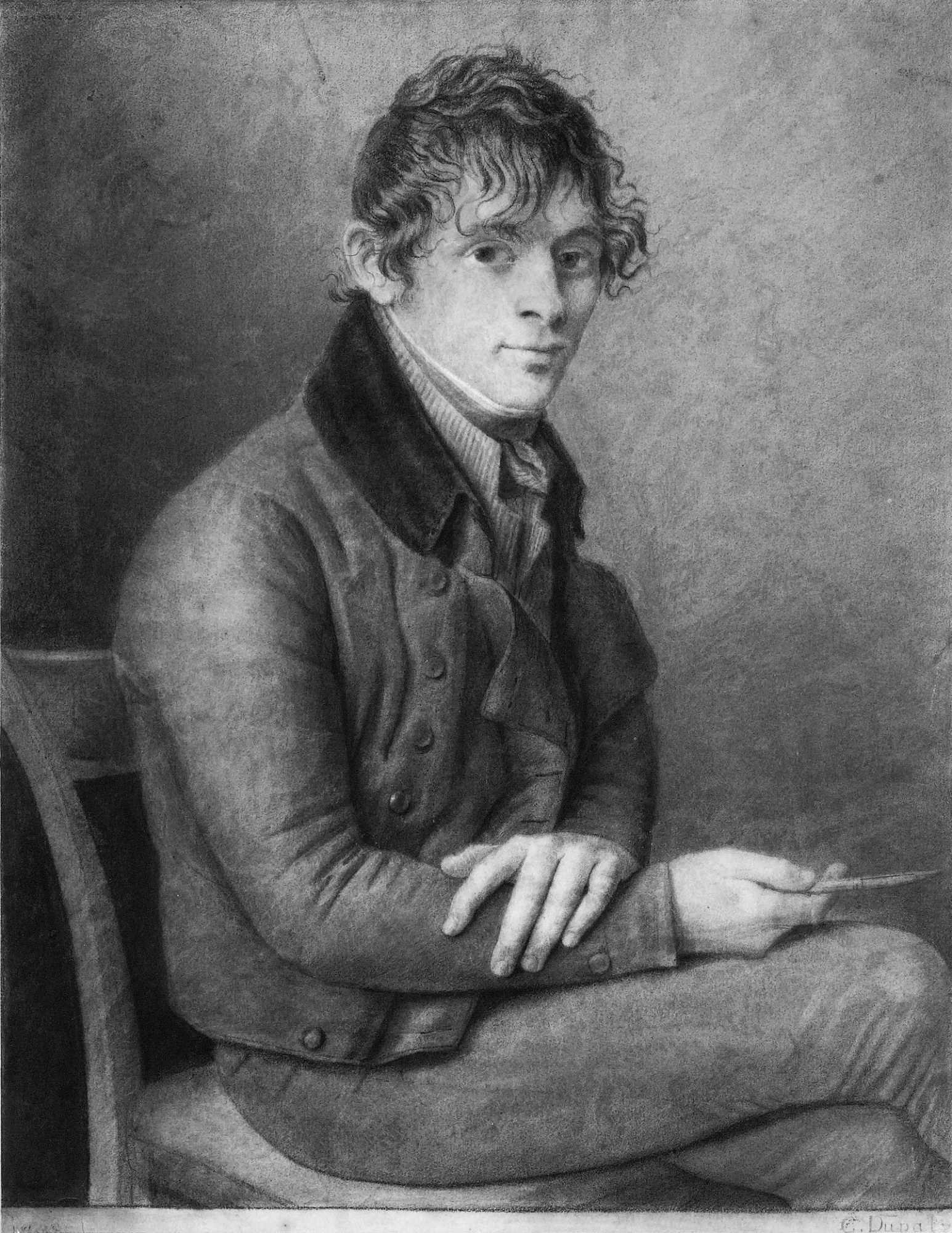
- Self portrait (1808)
- Born: 29 September 1771; Bordeaux, France
- Died: 12 November 1825 (aged 54); Paris, France
- Occupation: Sculptor
- Relatives: Emmanuel Mercier Dupaty (brother)

Louis-Marie-Charles-Henri Mercier Dupaty (29 September 1771, in Bordeaux – 12 November 1825, in Paris) was a French sculptor.

The eldest son of the magistrate Jean-Baptiste Mercier Dupaty and brother of the writer and académicien Emmanuel Mercier Dupaty, he was destined for the magistrature but preferred the arts. He studied in the atelier of François-Frédéric Lemot and obtained a Premier Grand Prix in sculpture, 1799, with his Pericles visiting Anaxagoras. On his return from the French Academy in Rome he was named to the Institut de France, in 1816, then appointed a professor at the École des Beaux-Arts.

== Works ==
- Portrait of Gen. Charles Victor Emmanuel Leclerc, (Salon of 1812), marble, standing figure over lifesize (Versailles);
- Venus Genetrix (1810), marble Jardin des Plantes, Paris;
- completed Antoine-Denis Chaudet's Infant Oedipus and Phorbas (1799), shown at the Salon of 1801, after Chaudet's death, in cooperation with Pierre Cartellier;
- Venus before Paris (1822), marble, over lifesize figure, Versailles
- Cadmus and the Dragon
- Dying Biblis changed into a Spring (1819), marble, Musée du Louvre
- Ajax defying the Gods
- Model for the equestrian monument to Louis XIII (1816), completed by Jean-Pierre Cortot for Place des Vosges and installed in 1825.
- Portrait bust of Vincent-Marie Viénot de Vaublanc, (1820), Dahesh Museum of Art.

== Selected works ==
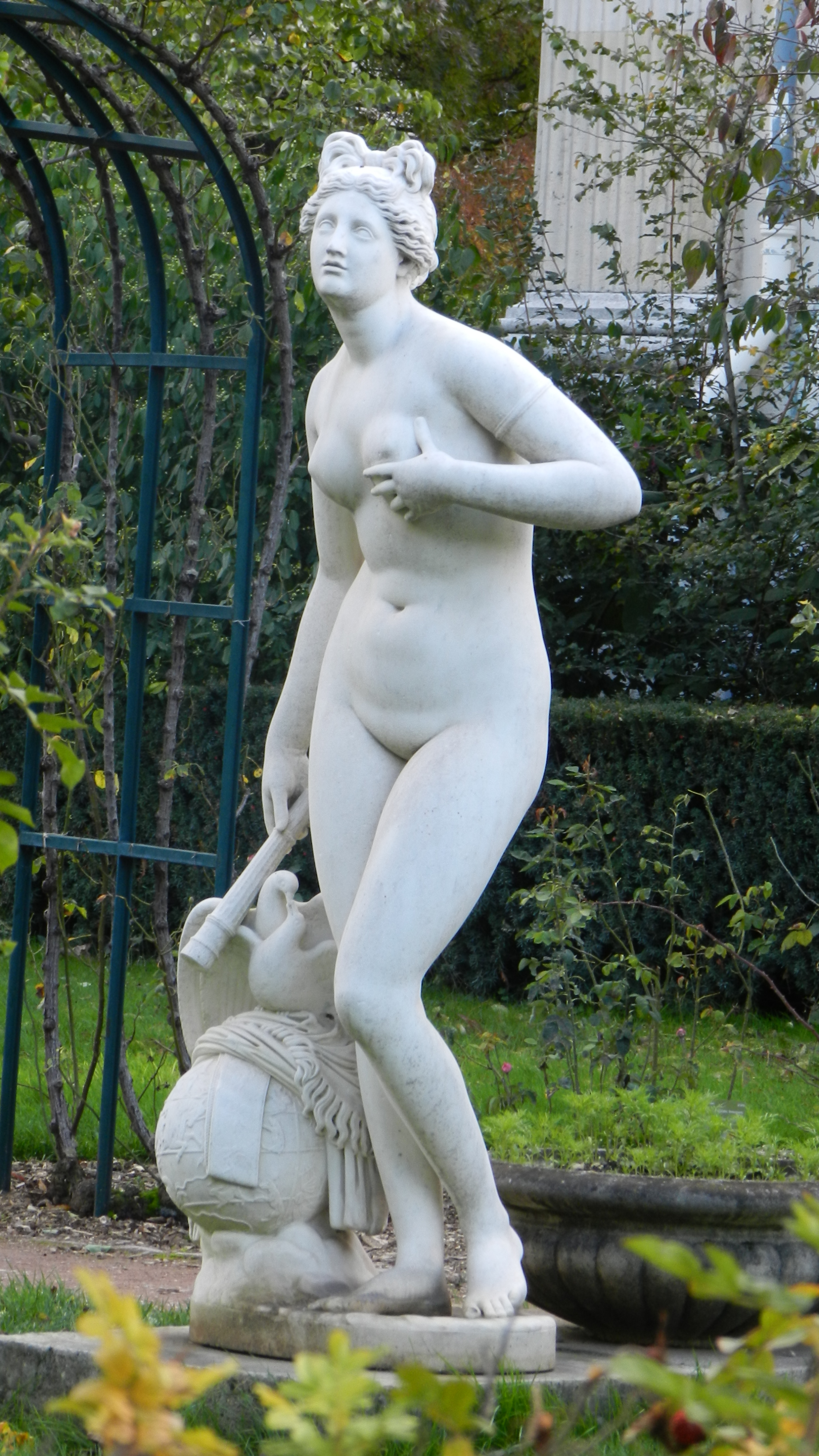
Vénus genitrix (1810), Jardin des Plantes de Paris.

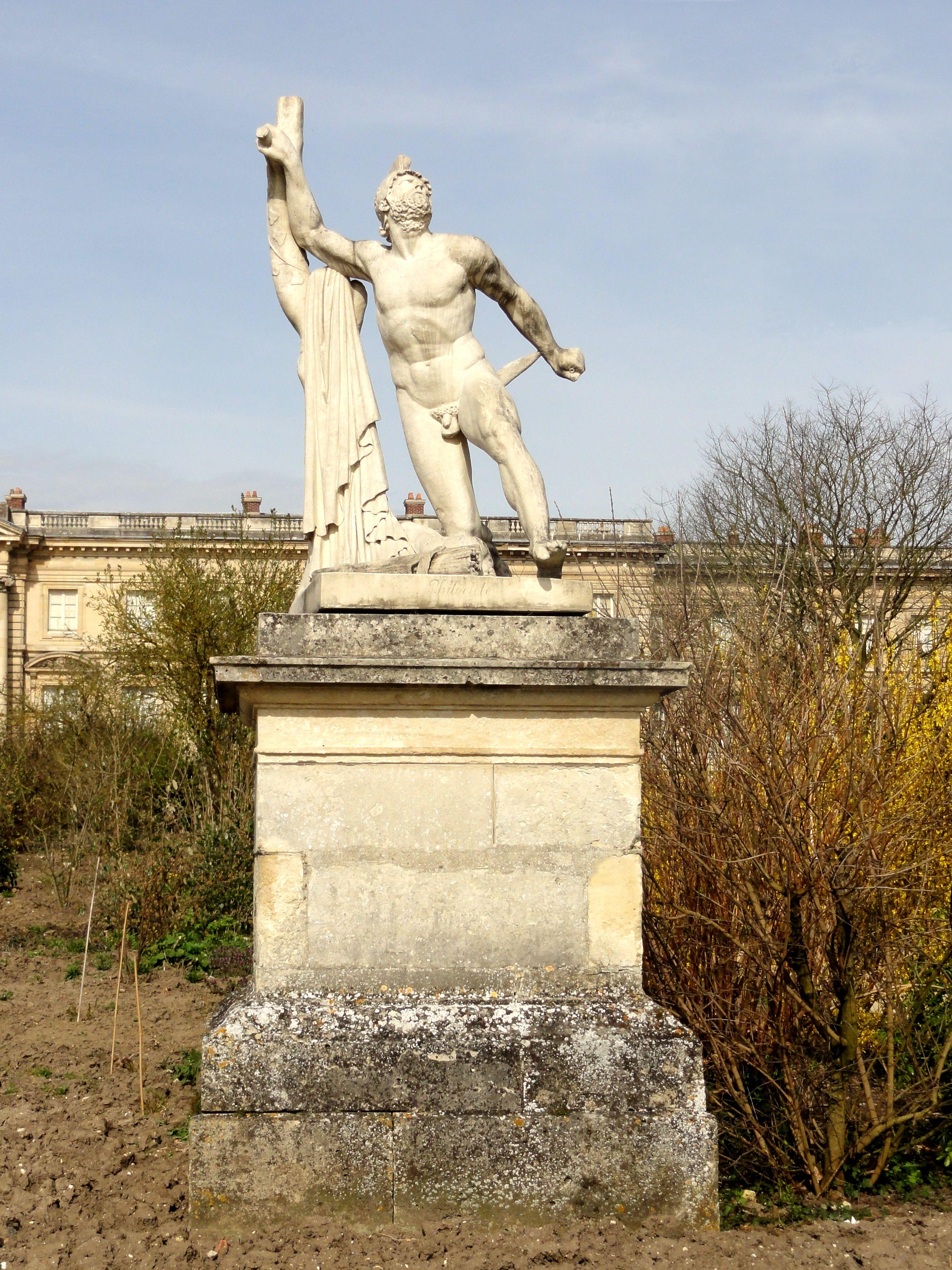
Philoctète blessé (1810), park at the Château de Compiègne.

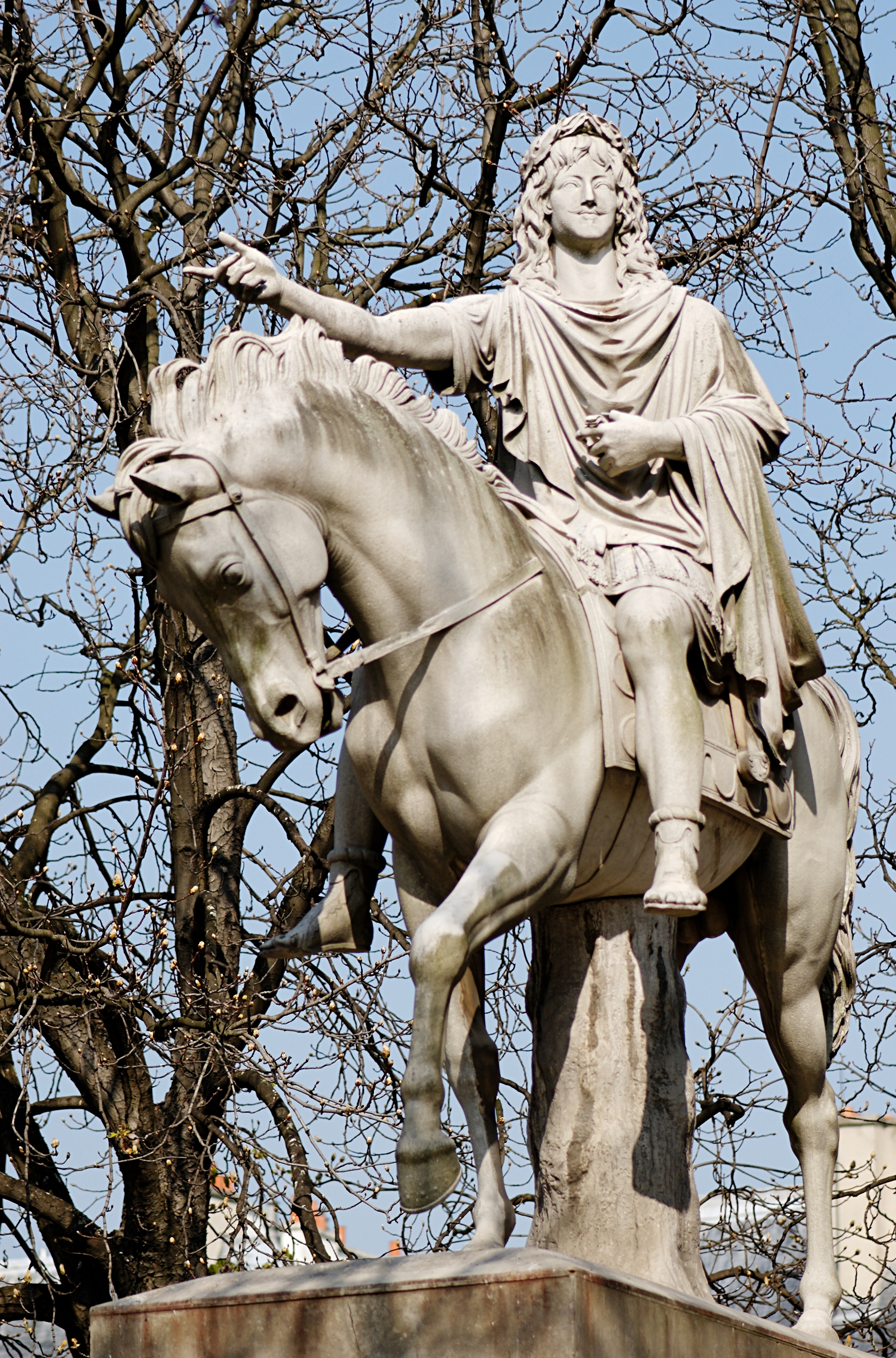
Equestrian statue of Louis XIII, Place des Vosges

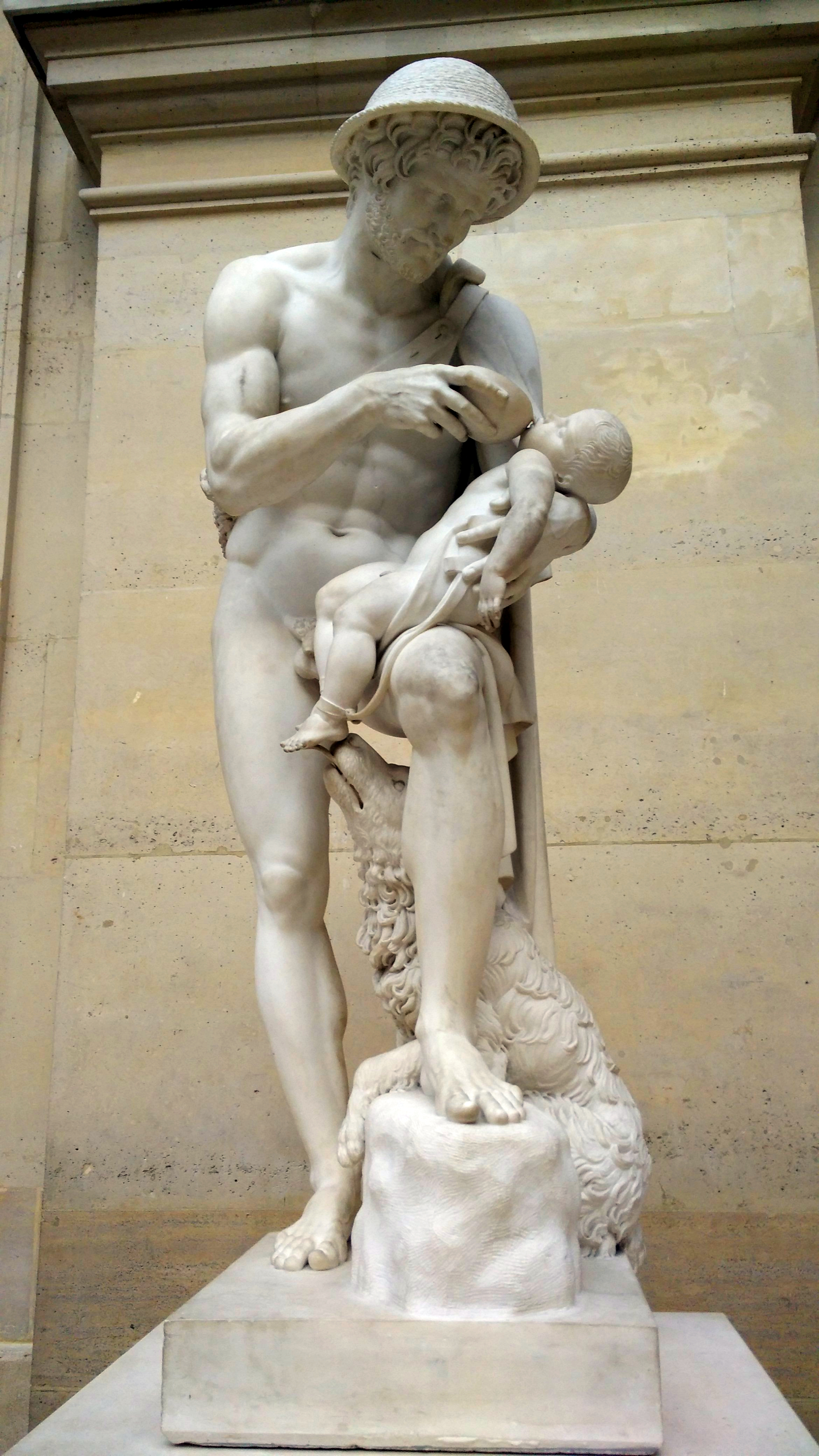
Oedipus nurtured by Phorbas
