= Emmanuel Dupaty =

French writer, naval officer and administrator (1775–1851)

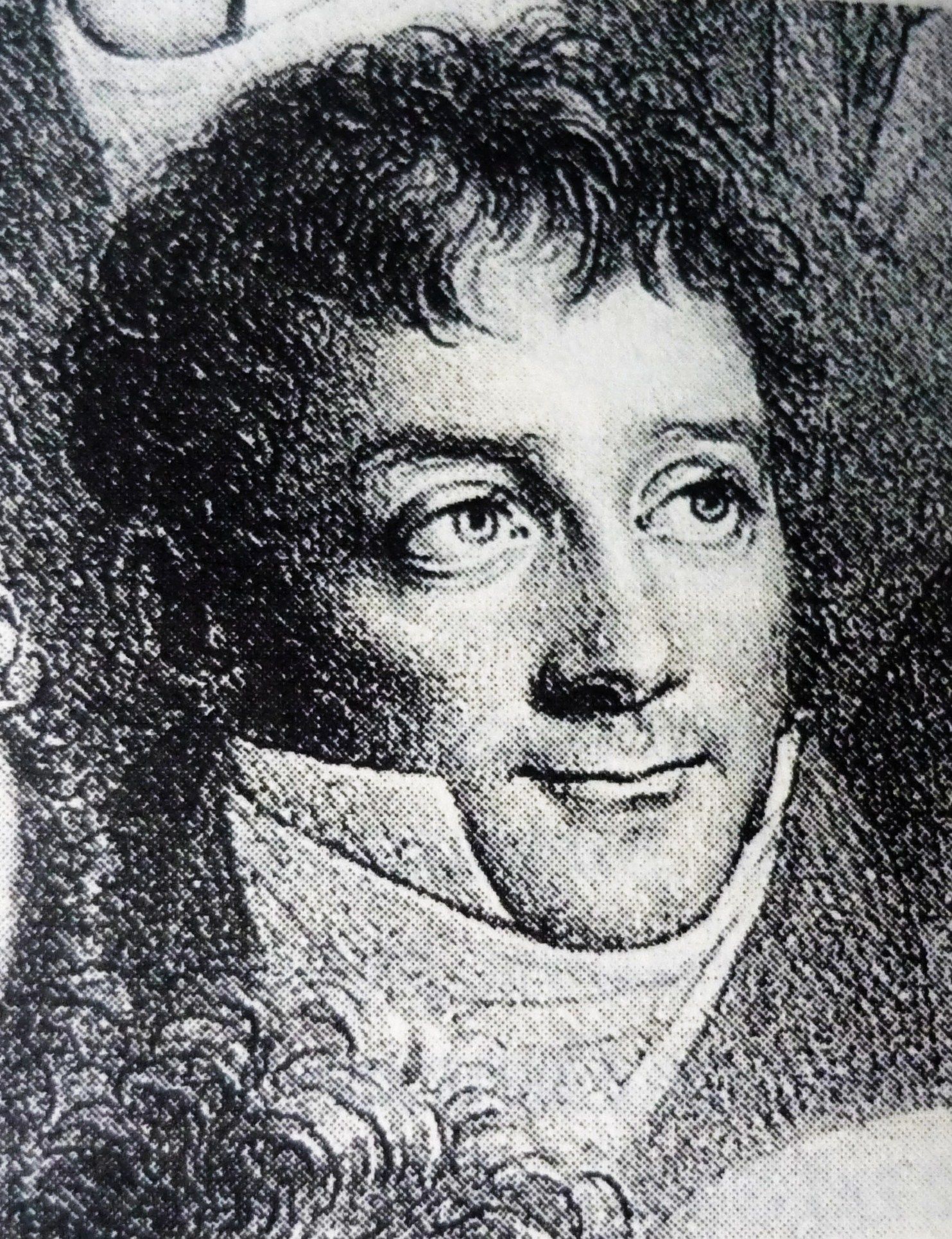
- Born: 31 July 1775; Blanquefort, Gironde, France
- Died: 31 July 1851 (aged 76); Paris, France
- Occupations: playwright, naval officer, singer, journalist
- Relatives: Louis Dupaty (brother)

Louis Emmanuel Dupaty (31 July 1775 – 30 July 1851) was a French playwright, naval officer, chansonnier, journalist and administrator of the Bibliothèque de l'Arsenal. He was the younger brother of the sculptor Louis Dupaty.

== Works ==
Theatre

- Figaro, directeur des marionnettes, comédie en 1 acte et en prose, mêlée de vaudevilles et d'ariettes, Paris, théâtre du Palais-Royal, 31 décembre 1784
- Arlequin journaliste, comédie en 1 acte, en prose, mêlée de vaudevilles, Paris, Théâtre du Vaudeville, 22 frimaire an VI (1797) Text on line
- L'Opéra-comique, opéra-comique en 1 acte, en prose et ariettes, Paris, Opéra-comique, 21 messidor an VI (1797)
- Les Français à Cythère, comédie en 1 acte, en prose, mêlée de vaudevilles, Paris, Vaudeville, 17 March 1798
- Le Chapitre second, comédie en un acte, Paris, Opéra-Comique, 29 prairial an 7 (1798)
- Le Déménagement du salon, ou le Portrait de Gilles, comédie-parade en 1 acte et en vaudevilles, Paris, Théâtre du Vaudeville, 25 vendémiaire an VII
- Arlequin tout seul, comédie-monologue en prose et vaudevilles, Paris, Théâtre du Vaudeville, 14 frimaire an VII (1798)
- Le Buste de Préville, impromptu en 1 acte et en prose, Paris, Théâtre de la République, 25 nivôse an VIII (1799)
- La Girouette de Saint-Cloud, impromptu en 1 acte, en prose, mêlé de vaudevilles, Paris, Théâtre du Vaudeville, 23 brumaire an VIII (1799)
- D'auberge en auberge, ou les Préventions, comédie en 3 actes, Paris, Opéra-Comique, 26 April 1800
- Sophie, ou la Malade qui se porte bien, comédie en 3 actes, mêlée de vaudevilles, Paris, Théâtre du Vaudeville, 8 February 1802
- L'Antichambre ou les Valets maîtres, opéra comique in one act and in prose, music by Nicolas Dalayrac, 27 February 1802 (8 ventôse an X) Opéra-Comique (Théâtre Feydeau)
- Picaros et Diego ou la Folle Soirée, opéra comique in one act and in prose, music by Nicolas Dalayrac, [revival of L'Antichambre], created 3 May 1803 (13 floréal an XI) at the Opéra-Comique (Théâtre Feydeau)
- La Prison militaire, ou les Trois prisonniers, comédie en 5 actes et en prose, Paris, Théâtre Louvois, 18 July 1803
- La Jeune Prude ou les Femmes entre elles, comedy in act and in prose mingled with ariettes, music by Nicolas Dalayrac, created at the Opéra-Comique (Théâtre Feydeau), 14 January 1804 (3 nivôse an XI)
- Les Deux Pères ou la leçon de botanique, comédie en 2 actes mêlée de vaudevilles, Paris, Théâtre du Vaudeville, 4 June 1804
- Ossian cadet, ou les Guimbardes, parodie des "Bardes", vaudeville en 3 petits actes qui n'en font qu'un, Paris, Théâtre du Vaudeville, 11 thermidor an XII (July 1804)
- Les Vélocifères, comédie-parade en 1 acte, mêlée de vaudevilles, Paris, Théâtre du Vaudeville, 29 floréal an 12 (1804)
- Les Femmes colères, divertissement en 1 acte, en prose, mêlé de vaudevilles, Paris, Théâtre du Vaudeville, 11 February 1805
- Le Lendemain de la pièce tombée, comédie en 1 acte, mêlée de vaudevilles, Paris, Théâtre du Vaudeville, 13 fructidor an XIII (1805)
- L'Intrigue aux fenêtres, opéra bouffon en 1 acte, Paris, Opéra-comique, 6 ventôse an XIII (1805)
- Le Jaloux malade, comédie en 1 acte et en prose, mêlée de vaudevilles, Paris, Théâtre du Vaudeville, 9 pluviôse an XIII (1805)
- Une matinée du Pont-Neuf, divertissement-parade en 1 acte, mêlé de vaudevilles, Paris, Théâtre du Vaudeville, January 1806
- L'Amant par vanité, ou le Père rival, comédie en 3 actes et en vers, Paris, Théâtre de l'Impératrice, 9 April 1806
- Agnès Sorel, comédie en 3 actes, mêlée de vaudevilles, Paris, Théâtre du Vaudeville, 19 April 1806
- La Jeune mère, ou les Acteurs de société, comédie en 2 actes, mêlée de vaudevilles, Paris, Théâtre du Vaudeville, 4 brumaire an XIV (October 1806)
- Le Séducteur en voyage, ou les voitures versées, comédie en 2 actes, mêlée de vaudevilles, Paris, Théâtre du Vaudeville, 4 December 1806
- Mademoiselle de Guise, opéra-comique en 3 actes, Paris, Opéra-comique, 17 March 1808
- Ninon chez Madame de Sévigné, comédie en 1 acte et en vers, mêlée de chants, Paris, Opéra-comique, 26 September 1808
- Françoise de Foix, opéra-comique en 3 actes, Paris, Opéra-comique, 28 January 1809
- Cagliostro ou la Séduction, opéra-comique en trois actes, Paris, Opéra-comique, 27 September 1810
- Le Poète et le Musicien ou Je cherche un sujet, comedy in three acts and in vers mingled with song, Dupaty added a prologue in free verse in honour to Dalayrac, music by Nicolas Dalayrac, created at the Opéra-Comique (Théâtre Feydeau), 30 May 1811
- La Petite revue lyonnaise, ou Fanchon la vielleuse à Lyon, comédie-vaudeville impromptu en 1 acte, Lyon, Théâtre des Célestins, 7, 8, 9 and 10 November 1811
- Avis aux mères, ou les Deux fêtes, comédie en 1 acte et en vers, Paris, Théâtre-Français, 14 January 1813
- Le Camp de Sobieski, ou le Triomphe des femmes, comédie en 2 actes et en vers, mêlée de chant, Paris, Opéra-comique, 21 April 1813
- Bayard à Mézières, opéra-comique en 1 acte, Paris, Opéra-comique, 12 February 1814
- Félicie, ou la Jeune fille romanesque, opéra-comique en 3 actes et en prose, Paris, Opéra-comique, 28 February 1815
- Les Voitures versées, opéra-comique en 2 actes, Paris, Opéra-comique, 29 April 182?
- Un dernier jour de fortune, comédie-vaudeville en 1 acte, Paris, Théâtre du Gymnase, 11 November 1823

Divers

- Les Délateurs, ou Trois années du dix-neuvième siècle (1819)
- L'Art poétique des demoiselles et des jeunes gens, ou Lettres à Isaure sur la poésie, Première partie comprenant l'histoire de la poésie et des poètes anciens (1824)
