= Charles-François-Jean-Baptiste Moreau de Commagny =

French playwright and author (1783–1832)

Mémoires historiques et littéraires about F.-J. Talma by C-F-J-B Moreau, 1827

Charles-François-Jean-Baptiste Moreau de Commagny (Paris, 1783 – Paris, 1 July 1832) was a French playwright, librettist, poet and chansonnier.

His plays, sometimes signed with different names (C.-F.-J.-B. Moreau, C.-A. Moreau, A. Moreau, Eustache Lasticot or simply M), were presented on the most important Parisian stages of his time: (Théâtre du Vaudeville, Théâtre du Palais-Royal, Gymnase dramatique, Théâtre des Variétés, etc.)

== Works ==
- 1801: Les Portraits au salon, ou le Mariage imprévu, comédie en vaudeville in 1 act, with Michel-Nicolas Balisson de Rougemont,
- 1801: La Vaccine, folie-vaudeville in 1 act and in prose, with Théophile Marion Dumersan
- 1802: Les Amours de la halle, vaudeville poissard in 1 act, with Charles Henrion
- 1802: Allons en Russie, vaudeville épisodique in 1 act, with Henrion
- 1803: Cassandre aveugle, ou le Concert d'Arlequin, comédie-parade in 1 act, mingled with vaudevilles, with René de Chazet and Dumersan
- 1803: Cassandre huissier, comédie-parade in 1 act, mingled with vaudevilles, with Henrion
- 1804: Le Dansomane de la rue Quincampoix, ou le Bal interrompu, folie-vaudeville in 1 act, with Joseph Servières
- 1804: La Manie de l'indépendance, ou Scapin tout seul, monologue in prose, mingled with vaudeville, with Dumersan
- 1804: Ossian cadet, ou les Guimbardes, parodie des Bardes, vaudeville in 3 acts, with Dupaty and Chazet
- 1804: Les Vélocifères, comédie parade in 1 act, with de Chazet and Dupaty
- 1805: Les Chevilles de Maître Adam menuisier de Nevers ou les Poètes artisans, with Francis
- 1805: La Nouvelle Nouveauté, comédie épisodique in 1 act, in prose, mingled with vaudevilles, with Lafortelle
- 1805: Les Femmes colères, entertainment in 1 act, in prose, mingled with vaudevilles, with Emmanuel Dupaty and Francis, 1805
- 1806: La Nuit d'auberge, comedy in 1 act and in prose, mingled with vaudevilles
- 1806: Gallet, ou le Chansonnier droguiste, comedy in 1 act, in prose, mingled with vaudevilles, with Francis
- 1806: Voltaire chez Ninon, historical event in 1 act and in prose, mingled with vaudevilles, with Lafortelle
- 1807: Une journée chez Bancelin, comedy in 1 act, in prose, mingled with vaudevilles, withFrancis
- 1807: Le Panorama de Momus, inauguration prologue, in prose and vaudevilles, for the new hall of the Théâtre des Variétés, with Francis and Désaugiers
- 1807: Les Bateliers du Niémen, vaudeville in 1 act, in prose, with Marc-Antoine Désaugiers and Francis baron d'Allarde
- 1808: Les Avant-postes du maréchal de Saxe, comedy in 1 act and in prose, mingled with vaudevilles, with Henri-François Dumolard
- 1808: Poisson chez Colbert, comedy, with Lafortelle
- 1808: Haine aux hommes, comedy in 1 act, mingled with vaudevilles, with Francis
- 1808: Mincétoff, parody of Menzikoff, with Desaugiers and Francis
- 1808 Le Bouquet impromptu, presented to the prince archi-chancelier of the Empire, on 24 June 1808, jour de Saint-Jean
- 1808: Taconnet chez Ramponneau, ou le Réveillon de la courtille, comedy foly in 1 act, in prose mingled with couplets, with Francis and Désaugiers
- 1809: Le Petit Courrier ou Comme les femmes se vengent, comedy in 2 acts, in prose, mingled with vaudevilles, with Jean-Nicolas Bouilly
- 1809: Madame Favart, comedy in 1 act, in prose, mingled with vaudevilles, with Dumolard
- 1809: Un tour de Colalto, comedy in 1 act, in prose, mingled with vaudevilles, with Dumolard
- 1810: Boileau à Auteuil, comedy in 1 act and in prose, mingled with vaudevilles, with Francis
- 1810: Une visite à Saint-Cyr
- 1810: Relâche pour la répétition générale de Fernand Cortez, ou le Grand opéra en province, parody in 1 act, with Rougemont and Merle
- 1810: Les Époux de trois jours, ou J'enlève ma femme, comedy in 2 acts, in prose, mingled with vaudevilles, with Ourry
- 1810: Les Sabotiers béarnais, ou la Faute d'orthographe, vaudeville in 1 act, in prose, with Chavagnac
- 1811: L'Exil de Rochester ou la Taverne, comédie anecdotique in 1 act, in prose, mingled with vaudevilles, with Dumolard
- 1811: La Petite Gouvernante, comedy in 2 acts and in prose, mingled with vaudevilles, with Michel-Joseph Gentil de Chavagnac
- 1812: L'Anglais à Bagdad, comédie-anecdote in 1 act, in prose, mingled with de vaudevilles, with Maurice Ourry and Emmanuel Théaulon
- 1812: Jérusalem déshabillée, with Ourry and Théaulon
- 1812: Paris volant, ou la Fabrique d'ailes, folie-épisodique en 1 act, in prose and in vaudevilles, with Ourry and Théaulon
- 1812: La Chevalière d'Éon, ou les Parieurs anglais, comedy in 1 act, in prose, mingled with vaudevilles, with Ourry
- 1813: Le Château d'If, comedy in 1 act and in vaudevilles
- 1813: Tout pour l'enseigne, ou la Manie du jour, vaudeville in 1 act, with Lafortelle, Nicolas Brazier and Merle
- 1814: Monsieur Crouton, ou l'Aspirant au salon, pièce grivoise in 1 act, with Lafortelle and Francis
- 1814: Le Voile d'Angleterre, ou la Revendeuse à la toilette, comédie en vaudevilles in 1 act
- 1815: La Bouquetière anglaise, comédie-anecdote ei 1 acti, in prose, mingled with vaudevilles
- 1815: Le Cordier de Samarcande, ou Tout tient au bonheur, comedy in 1 act, in prose, mingled with couplets, with Lafortelle
- 1815: Le Vaudeville en vendanges, petit à-propos villageois in 1 act, mingled with couplets, with Désaugiers and Chavagnac
- 1816: Les Caméléons, comédie en vaudevilles in 1 act, in prose, with Pierre-Jean de Béranger
- 1816: Les Visites bourgeoises, ou le Dehors et le dedans, short sketch of a large tableau, in 1 act, mingled with couplets, with Désaugiers and Chavagnac
- 1817: Les Deux Gaspard, comédie en vaudevilles, with Pierre Capelle
- 1817: Les Deux Précepteurs, comédie en vaudevilles, with Scribe
- 1818: Baboukin, ou le Sérail en goguette, vaudeville in 1 act, with A.-M. Lafortelle and Jean-Toussaint Merle
- 1818: Il n'y a plus d'enfants, ou la Journée d'un pensionnat, tableau en vaudevilles, with Pierre-Frédéric-Adolphe Carmouche and Henri Dupin
- 1818: L'Innocente et le Mirliton, vaudeville grivois in 1 act, with Carmouche and Gabriel de Lurieu
- 1818: Un second Théâtre-Français, ou le Kaléidoscope théâtral, review in 1 act, mingled with couplets, with Carmouche, Dupin and de Lurieu
- 1819: La Robe feuille-morte, one-act play, mingled with couplets, with Jean-Baptiste Dubois
- 1820: Le Sac vert, pot pourri, ou Récit véridique du procès de la reine d'Angleterre
- 1820: Chansons et poésies diverses
- 1821: La Femme du sous-préfet, ou le Charlatan, comedy in 1 act, in prose, mingled with couplets, with Sewrin
- 1821: Les Joueurs, ou la Hausse et la baisse, comedy in 1 act, mingled with couplets, with Francis
- 1821: Scène ajoutée au Boulevard Bonne-Nouvelle pour l'anniversaire de la naissance de Molière, with Mélesville and Scribe
- 1822: Le Comédien d'Étampes, with Charles-Augustin Sewrin
- 1822: Le Garde-moulin, comédie en vaudevilles, with Sewrin
- 1822: Kabri le sabotier, ou les Chiquenaudes, comédie-féerie in 1 act, mingled with couplets, with Sewrin
- 1827: Mémoires historiques et littéraires sur F.-J. Talma
- 1827: Masaniello, historical drama in 4 acts, with Lafortelle7
- 1829: Le Boulevard Bonne-Nouvelle, prologue in vaudeville, with Mélesville and Eugène Scribe
- 1829: La Grisette mariée, comédie en vaudevilles in 2 acts, with Armand d'Artois and Louis-Émile Vanderburch
- 1830: L'Auberge d'Auray, lyrical drama in 1 act, with Jean-Baptiste-Rose-Bonaventure Violet d'Épagny, Ferdinand Hérold and Michele Carafa
- 1830: Philibert marié, comédie en vaudevilles in 1 act, with Scribe
- 1831: La Langue musicale, opéra comique in 1 act, with Gabriel de Lurieu
- 1825: Un mois de fidélité, with Achille d'Artois, posthumous
- undated: La Tante Loriot, one-act vaudeville, with Alfred Delacour

== Bibliography ==
- Antoine-Vincent Arnault, Antoine Jay, Étienne de Jouy, Biographie nouvelle des contemporains, 1824, p. 390 (read line)
- Pierre-Charles-Tr. Desrochers, Nécrologe de 1832 ou notices historiques sur les hommes les plus marquants, 1833, p. 220
- Joseph Marie Quérard, La Littérature contemporaine, 1834, p. 292-293
- Charles Weiss, Biographie universelle, 1841, p. 286
