= Francis baron d'Allarde =

French playwright (1778–1841)

- Born: Marie-François-Denis-Thérésa Le Roy Allarde; 12 March 1778; Besançon
- Died: 4 November 1841 (aged 63); Paris
- Occupations: Playwright, chansonnier

Marie-François-Denis-Thérésa Le Roy Allarde better known as Francis baron d'Allarde (12 March 1778 – 4 October 1841) was a 19th-century French chansonnier and playwright.

== Biography ==
The son of the politician Pierre d'Allarde, he was a journalist in the United-States (1794-1796) where he was responsible for a column devoted to good manners in a newspaper of Massachusetts. He graduated from University of Cambridge and returned to France in 1797 with the French legation. He began a career in theater with Arlequin aux Petites Maisons, a play which was given at Théâtre des Troubadours .

His plays, some of which achieved a great success, signed under many pseudonyms (Francis, M. Sapajou, baron d'Allarde...) were presented on the most important Parisian stages of the 19th century including the Théâtre des Variétés, the Théâtre de la Porte-Saint-Martin, and the Théâtre du Vaudeville.

He is buried at Père Lachaise Cemetery (6th division).

== Works ==
- Arlequin aux Petites Maisons, folie in 1 act and on prose, 1798
- Les Dieux à Tivoli, ou l'Ascension de l'Olympe, folie non fastueuse, arlequinade, impromptu in 1 act and vaudevilles, with Charles-Guillaume Étienne, Morel and Joseph Servières, 1799
- La Martingale, ou le Secret de gagner au jeu, arlequinade-vaudeville in 1 act and in prose, with Joseph Servières, 1801
- Lui-même, one-act opéra comique, 1802
- Caponnet, ou l'Auberge supposée, one-act vaudeville, with René de Chazet, 1804
- C'est ma femme, one-act vaudeville, with Désaugiers, 1804
- Deux pour un, one-act comedy, with de Chazet, 1804
- L'École des Gourmands, one-act vaudeville, with de Chazet and A.-M. Lafortelle, 1804
- L'Hôtel de Lorraine, ou la Mine est trompeuse, one-act proverbe, mingled with vaudevilles, with de Chazet and Lafortelle, 1804
- M. Pistache, ou le Jour de l'an, folie in 1 act, mingled with vaudevilles, with Désaugiers, 1804
- Mylord Go, ou le 18 brumaire, tableau impromptu in 1 act, mingled with vaudevilles, with Désaugiers, 1804
- Oh ! que c'est sciant, ou Oxessian, with Désaugiers, 1804
- L'Un après l'autre, ou les Deux trappes, one-act comedy, mingled with vaudevilles, with Désaugiers, 1804
- Arlequin Musard, ou J'ai le temps, one-act vaudeville-parade in prose, with Marc-Antoine Désaugiers, 1805
- Arlequin tyran domestique, one-act enfantillage, mingled with vaudevilles, with Désaugiers and Tournay, 1805
- Les Chevilles de Maître Adam, menuisier de Nevers, ou les Poètes artisans, one-act comedy, with Commagny, 1805
- Les Femmes colères, one-act divertissement, in prose, mingled with vaudevilles, with Emmanuel Dupaty and Commagny, 1805
- Boileau à Auteuil, comedy in 1 act and in prose, mingled with vaudevilles, with Commagny, 1806
- Faut-il se marier ?, two-act comedy, mingled with vaudevilles, with Lafortelle, 1806
- Gallet, ou le Chansonnier droguiste, one-act comedy, in prose, 1806
- Le Vieux Chasseur, three-act comedy, with Désaugiers, 1806
- Ma tante Urlurette, ou le Chant du coq, one-act folie-vaudeville, with Désaugiers, 1806
- Une matinée du Pont-Neuf, one-act divertissement-parade, mingled with vaudevilles, with Désaugiers, Michel Dieulafoy and Emmanuel Dupaty, 1806
- Mars en Carême, ou l'Olympe au Rocher de Cancale, folie-vaudeville in 1 act and in prose, with Désaugiers, 1806
- Les Bateliers du Niémen, one-act vaudeville, in prose, à l'occasion de la paix, followed by a divertissement, with Désaugiers and Charles-François-Jean-Baptiste Moreau de Commagny, 1807
- Une journée chez Bancelin, one-act comedy, in prose, mingled with vaudevilles, with Commagny, 1807
- Le Loup-garou, comedy in 1 act and in prose, mingled with couplets, with Maurice Ourry, 1807
- Le Panorama de Momus, prologue d'inauguration, in prose and in vaudevilles, for the new salle at the Théâtre des Variétés, with Désaugiers and Commagny, 1807
- M. Giraffe, ou la Mort de l'ours blanc, one-act vaudeville, 1807
- Taconnet chez Ramponneau, ou le Réveillon de la Courtille, one-act comedy folie, in prose mingled with couplets, with Désaugiers and Commagny, 1807
- Comme ça vient et comme ça passe, one-act comedy, mingled with vaudevilles, 1808
- Haine aux hommes, one-act comedy, 1808
- Mincétoff, parodie de Menzikoff, with Désaugiers, 1808
- Jocrisse aux enfers, ou l'Insurrection diabolique, vaudeville infernal in 1 act and in prose, with Désaugiers, 1809
- Le Gâteau des rois, comédie grivoise et poissarde in 1 act, 1809
- Monsieur Brouillon, ou l'Ami de tout le monde, one-act comedy, in prose, 1813
- Les Étourdis en voyage, ou Chacun son tour, comédie en 1 acte, 1814
- L'Homme entre deux âges, one-act comedy, with Sewrin, 1814
- Monsieur Crouton, ou l'Aspirant au Salon, pièce grivoise in 1 act, mingled with couplets, with Lafortelle, 1814
- La Féerie des arts, ou le Sultan de Cachemire, folie-féerie vaudeville in 1 act, with Armand d'Artois and Gabriel de Lurieu, 1819
- Les Visites à Momus, folie-vaudeville in 1 act, with Armand d'Artois and de Lurieu, 1820
- Les Étrennes du vaudeville, ou la Pièce impromptu, folie-parade in 1 act, mingled with couplets, with Désaugiers and Michel-Joseph Gentil de Chavagnac, 1821
- Les Joueurs, ou la Hausse et la baisse, one-act comedy, mingled with couplets, with Lafortelle, 1821
- La Marchande de goujons, ou les Trois Bossus, vaudeville grivois in 1 act, with Armand d'Artois, 1821
- Le Ministériel, satire, 1821
- La Nina de la rue Vivienne, with Armand d'Artois and de Lurieu, 1821
- Monsieur Lerond, comédie-vaudeville in 1 act, with de Lurieu, 1821
- Les Moissonneurs de la Beauce, ou le Soldat laboureur, comédie villageoise in 1 act, mingled with couplets, with Nicolas Brazier and Théophile Marion Dumersan, 1821
- Les Cris de Paris, tableau poissard in 1 act, mingled with couplets, with Armand d'Artois and Antoine Simonnin, 1822
- La Fille mal gardée, ou La coupe des foins, one-act comédie-vaudeville, with Brazier and Dumersan, 1822
- Oreste et Pilade, renewed parody of Favart, à propos Clytemnestre, with Armand d'Artois, 1822
- Les Petits acteurs, ou les Merveilles à la mode, one-act comédie-vaudeville, with Dumersan and Brazier, 1822
- Les Amours de village, one-act vaudeville, with Achille d'Artois, 1823
- L'Enfant de Paris, ou le Débit de consolations, with Armand d'Artois and de Lurieu, 1823
- Polichinelle aux eaux d'Enghien, one-act tableau-vaudeville, with Armand d'Artois and Saintine, 1823
- Le Polichinelle sans le savoir, comédie-parade mingled with couplets, with Armand d'Artois and Jouslin de La Salle, 1823
- Le Fabricant, ou la Filature, one-act comédie-vaudeville, with Brazier, 1823
- Guillaume, Gautier et Garguille, ou le Cœur et la pensée, with Armand d'Artois and de Lurieu, 1823
- Partie et revanche, one-act comédie-vaudeville, with Brazier and Eugène Scribe, 1823
- La Petite Babet, ou les Deux gouvernantes, one-act comédie-vaudeville, with Armand d'Artois, 1823
- La Route de Poissy, one-actvaudeville, with Armand d'Artois, 1823
- Chansons, 1824
- Les deux boxeurs ou les Anglais de Falaise et de Nanterre, folie parade in 1 act mingled with couplets, with Désaugiers and Simonnin, 1824
- La Famille du porteur d'eau, one-act comédie-vaudeville, with Armand d'Artois, 1824
- Les Personnalités, ou le Bureau des cannes, one-act vaudeville épisodique, with de Lurieu and Armand d'Artois, 1824
- L'École des ganaches, with Armand d'Artois and de Lurieu, 1824
- Monsieur Antoine, ou le N̊ 2782, one-act vaudeville, with Saintine, 1824
- Thibaut et Justine, ou le Contrat sur le grand chemin, one-act comédie-anecdotique, mingled with couplets, with Armand d'Artois and de Lurieu, 1824
- Les Ouvriers, ou Les bons enfans, one-act comédie grivoise, mingled with couplets, with Dumersan and Brazier, 1824
- Le Magasin de masques, one-act folie de carnaval, with Brazier and Jouslin de La Salle, 1824
- L'imprimeur sans caractère, ou Le classique et le romantique, with Armand d'Artois and de Lurieu, 1824
- Les Quinze, ou les Déménagements, one-act comédie-vaudeville, with Frédéric de Courcy and Ferdinand Langlé, 1824
- Les Deux Jockos, one-act singerie, mingled with couplets, with Armand d'Artois and Gabriel de Lurieu, 1825
- Le Champenois, ou les Mystifications, one-act comédie-vaudeville, with Achille and Armand d'Artois, 1825
- Les Acteurs à l'auberge, one-act comedy, mingle with couplets, with Armand-François Jouslin de La Salle, 1825
- Le Commissaire du bal, ou l'Ancienne et la nouvelle mode, comédie-anecdote mingled with vaudevilles, in 1 act, with Armand d'Artois, 1825
- La Grand'Maman, ou le Lendemain de noces, one-act comédie-vaudeville, with Achille and Armand d'Artois, 1825
- Les Lorrains, with Armand d'Artois and de Lurieu, 1825
- La Vogue, vaudeville extravaganza, with Maurice Alhoy and Jouslin de La Salle, 1825
- Les Inconvéniens de la diligence, ou Monsieur Bonnaventure, 6 tableaux-vaudeville dans le même cadre, with Armand d'Artois and Théaulon, 1826
- Le Candidat, ou l'Athénée de Beaune, fice-act comédie-vaudeville, with Emmanuel Théaulon, 1826
- Le Capitaliste malgré lui, one-act comédie-vaudeville, with Armand d'Artois and X.-B. Saintine, 1826
- Le Centenaire, ou la Famille des Gaillards, one-act comédie-vaudeville, with Armand d'Artois, 1826
- Les Jolis Soldats, tableau militaire, civil et vaudeville, imitated from Charlet, with Armand d'Artois, 1826
- Le Médecin des théâtres, ou les Ordonnances, one-act tableau épisodique, with Armand d'Artois and Théaulon, 1826
- M. François, ou Chacun sa manie, one-act comedy, mingled with couplets, with Armand d'Artois, 1826
- La Salle des pas perdus, tableau in 1 act and in vaudeville, with Langlé and de Courcy, 1826
- Les Trous à la lune, ou Apollon en faillite, one-act à-propos-folie, with Théaulon and Armand d'Artois, 1826
- Le Protecteur, one-act comédie-vaudeville, with Armand d'Artois and Théaulon, 1826
- Clara Wendel, ou la Demoiselle brigand, two-act comédie-vaudeville, with Théaulon, 1827
- Les Deux Matelots, ou le Père malgré lui, one-act comédie-vaudeville, with Armand d'Artois, 1827
- Les Forgerons, two-act comédie-vaudeville, with Armand and Achille d'Artois, 1827
- La Halle au blé, ou l'Amour et la morale, with Armand d'Artois and Charles Nombret Saint-Laurent, 1827
- L'Homme de Paille, one-act comedy, mingled with vaudeville, with Achille and Armand d'Artois, 1827
- Les Trois faubourgs, ou le Samedi, le dimanche et le lundi, three-act comédie-vaudeville, with Armand d'Artois, 1827
- Les Employés, one-act comédie-vaudeville, with Maurice Alhoy, 1828
- Jean Pacot, ou Cinq Ans d'un conscrit, five-act vaudeville, with Armand d'Artois, 1828
- La Veille et le lendemain, ou Il faut bien aimer son mari, two-act comédie-vaudeville, with Armand and Achille d'Artois, 1828
- Une nuit au Palais-Royal, ou la garde nationale en 1830, one-act tableau vaudeville, with Auguste Anicet-Bourgeois, 1830
- Robespierre ou le 9 thermidor, drama in 3 acts and 9 tableaux, with Bourgeois, 1830
- Le Boa, ou le Bossu à la mode, one-act comédie-vaudeville, with Achille d'Artois and Francis Cornu, 1831
- Tom-Rick, ou le Babouin, three-act play imitated from English, with Armand d'Artois and Cornu, 1832
- Les Enragés, one-act tableau villageois, with Brazier and Armand d'Artois, 1835
- Les Épouseux d'campagne, one-act vaudeville, 1857

== Bibliography ==
- François-Xavier Feller, Biographie universelle, 1847, (p. 148)
- Louis Gabriel Michaud, Biographie universelle ancienne et moderne, 1859, (p. 265) (Read online)
- Paul Meunier, Francis d'Allarde, in Bulletin de la société nivernaise des lettres, t.19, 1901, (p. 58-65)
- Charles Weiss, Journal, vol. 2, 1981, (p. 348)
- Ginette Picat-Guinoiseau, Nodier et le théâtre, 1990, (p. 16)
