= A.-M. Lafortelle =

French playwright (1769–1851)

Auguste Lafortelle called A.-M. Lafortelle (11 January 1769 in Paris – 21 February 1851 in Paris) was an 18th/19th-century French playwright whose works were given on the most important Parisian stages of his time including the Théâtre des Variétés, the Théâtre du Palais-Royal, and the Théâtre du Vaudeville.

== Works ==
- 1775: Les Arsacides, tragedy in six acts, with Peyreau de Beaussol
- 1793: Cantiques faits à l'occasion d'une loge d'adoption
- 1799: Le Peintre dans son ménage, with Jacques-André Jacquelin
- 1802: Le Concert aux Champs-Élysées, vaudeville in 1 act, with René de Chazet
- 1803: Le Mot de l'énigme, vaudeville in 1 act, with de Chazet and Désaugiers
- 1804: L'Amour et l'argent, ou le Créancier rival, one-act comedy, in prose, mingled with vaudevilles, with de Chazet and Marc-Antoine Désaugiers
- 1804: L'Amant soupçonneux, one-act comedy, with de Chazet
- 1804: La Nouvelle nouveauté, comédie épisodique in 1 act, in prose, mingled with vaudevilles, with Commagny
- 1804: L'Hôtel de Lorraine, ou la Mine est trompeuse, proverbe in 1 act, mingled with vaudevilles, with de Chazet and baron d'Allarde
- 1804: La Belle Milanaise, ou la Fille-femme, page et soldat, melodrama in 3 acts, extravaganza, with Charles Henrion and Joseph Servières
- 1804: Les Charbonniers de la Forêt noire, three-act comed, mingled with vaudevilles, with Sewrin and Servières
- 1804: L'École des Gourmands, one-act vaudeville, with de Chazet and Francis baron d'Allarde
- 1805: La Fille jockey, one-act vaudeville, with de Chazet
- 1806: La Nuit d'auberge, one-act vaudeville
- 1806: Faut-il se marier ?, comedy in 2 acts, mingled with vaudevilles, with Francis baron d'Allarde
- 1806: Dubelloy, ou les Templiers, one-act vaudeville, with de Chazet
- 1806: Voltaire chez Ninon, fait historique in 1 act and in prose, mingled with vaudevilles, with Commagny
- 1808: Poisson chez Colbert, comedy in 1 act and in prose, mingled with vaudevilles, with Commagny
- 1809: Bérenger, ou l'Anneau de mariage, one-act vaudeville
- 1810: Une visite à Saint-Cyr, tableau historique in 1 act
- 1812: La Femme de chambre ou La Vengeance d'un gascon, one-act comedy
- 1813: Baboukin, ou le Sérail en goguette, one-act vaudeville, with Jean-Toussaint Merle and Charles-François-Jean-Baptiste Moreau de Commagny
- 1813: Le Sérail en goguette ou Le Panier de vin de champagne, one-act comedy, with Merle
- 1813: Tout pour l'enseigne, ou la Manie du jour, one-act vaudeville, with Brazier, Merle and Commagny
- 1814: Monsieur Crouton, ou l'Aspirant au Salon, pièce grivoise in 1 act, mingled with couplets, with Commagny and Francis
- 1815: Le Cordier de Samarcande, ou Tout tient au bonheur, one-act comedy, in prose, mingled with couplets, after a tale from the One Thousand Nights, with Commagny
- 1815: Les Rencontres au corps-de-garde, one-act comedy, with Brazier and Merle
- 1816: Les Deux vaudevilles, ou la Gaîté et le sentiment, vaudeville épisodique in 1 act, with Nicolas Brazier and Merle
- 1816: La Fin du monde, ou les Taches dans le soleil, vaudeville in 1 act, with Brazier and Merle
- 1819: Les Étrennes à contre-sens, one-act vaudeville, with Brazier et Merle
- 1821: Le Comédien de Bruxelles, ou la Prévention vaincue, comédie-anecdote in 1 act, mingled with vaudevilles
- 1821: Les Joueurs, ou la Hausse et la baisse, one-act comedy, mingled with couplets, with Francis baron d'Allarde
- 1827: Masaniello ou le pêcheur napolitain, lyrical drama in 4 acts, with Commagny

== Bibliography ==
- Pierre Larousse, Grand dictionnaire universel du XIXe siècle, 1873
- Camille Dreyfus, André Berthelot, La Grande encyclopédie: inventaire raisonné des sciences..., 1886, p. 758
