= Armand d'Artois =

French playwright and librettist (1788–1867)

- Born: François Victor Armand Dartois de Bournonville; 3 October 1788; Beaurains, Oise, France
- Died: 28 March 1867 (aged 78); Paris, France
- Occupations: Playwright, librettist

Armand d'Artois (3 October 1788 – 28 March 1867) was a 19th-century French playwright and librettist. He is fellow librettist Achille d'Artois's brother.

== Biography ==
Trained for the bar, he first worked as an attorney. The success of his play Les Finacés in 1808 caused him to devote himself entirely to literature. In 1814, he joined the guards of the king of Belgium. He left military service after receiving the Legion of Honour in 1818.

A very prolific author, he wrote under various collective pseudonyms such as Emmanuel, Emmanuel Arago, M. Sapajou, with Francis baron d'Allarde and Gabriel de Lurieu. As managing director of the Théâtre des Variétés from 1830 to 1836, he also directed Le Nain couleur de rose, a political, literary, and moral newspaper from 15 September 1815 to 5 May 1816. He collaborated with La Foudre by Alphonse de Beauchamp.

His plays were presented on some of the most important Parisian stages of the 19th century: Théâtre du Vaudeville, Théâtre des Variétés, Théâtre des Nouveautés, Théâtre du Palais-Royal, Théâtre des Folies-Dramatiques, etc.

== Works ==
- Les Fiancés, ou l'Amour et le Hasard, comedy in 1 act, mingled with vaudevilles, with Théaulon, 1808
- Les Femmes soldats ou la Forteresse mal défendue, folie-vaudeville in 1 act, with Théaulon, 1809
- Les Femmes rivaux, harlequinade in 1 act and in vaudevilles, with Théaulon, 1809
- Les Pêcheurs danois, historical vaudeville in 1 act, with Théaulon, 1810
- Les Six Pantoufles ou le Rendez-vous des Cendrillons, folie-vaudeville in 1 act and in prose, with Dupin and Antoine-Pierre-Charles Favart, 1810
- Le Sultan du Havre, folie-vaudeville in 1 act and in prose, with Dupin, 1810
- Partie carrée ou Chacun de son côté, comédie en vaudevilles in 1 act, with Dumersan and Théaulon, 1810
- Les Trois Fous ou la Jeune Veuve, comédie en vaudevilles in 1 act, 1810
- Le Pacha de Suresne ou l'Amitié des femmes, 1811
- Les Pages au sérail, comédie en vaudevilles in 2 acts, with Théaulon, 1811
- La Belle Allemande, historical fact in 1 act, with Henri Dupin, 1812
- Les Rendez-vous de minuit, comédie en vaudevilles in 1 act, with Dupin, 1812
- Bayard page, ou Vaillance et Beauté, trait historique in 2 acts and in vaudevilles, with Théaulon, 1812
- Le Boghey renversé ou Un point de vue de Longchamp, croquis in vaudevilles, with Théaulon and Étienne Jourdan, 1813
- Les Bêtes savantes, folie burlesque in 1 act and in vaudevilles, with Dumersan and Théaulon, 1813
- Le Nécessaire et le Superflu, comédie en vaudevilles in 1 act, with Théophile Marion Dumersan, 1813
- Le Cimetière du Parnasse ou Tippó malade, pompe funèbre in 1 act mingled with vaudevilles, with Théaulon, 1813
- La Tour de Witikind ou la Capitulation, comédie en vaudevilles in 1 act, with Dupin, 1813
- Le Courtisan dans l'embarras, comédie anecdote in 1 act, with Dupin, 1813
- Les maris ont tort, comédie en vaudevilles in 1 act, 1813
- L'Arbre de Vincennes, vaudeville héroïque in 3 acts, with Théaulon and Joseph-Denis Doche, 1814
- La Vénus hottentote, ou Haine aux françaises, with Nicolas Brazier and Théaulon, 1814
- La Route de Paris, ou les Allans et les Venans, tableau épisodique in 1 act, in vaudevilles, with Théaulon, 1814
- Les Clefs de Paris ou le Dessert d'Henri IV, trait historique in vaudeville, with Théaulon, 1814
- Psyché, ou la Curiosité des femmes, with Théaulon, 1814
- Les Visites, ou les Complimens du jour de l'an, tableau-vaudeville in 1 act, with Théaulon, 1814
- Le Roi et la Ligue, opéra comique in 2 acts, with Théaulon, 1815
- La Bataille de Denain, opéra comique in 3 acts, with Théaulon and Fulgence de Bury, 1816
- Un Mari pour étrennes, opéra comique in 1 act, with Théaulon, 1816
- La Rosière de Hartwell, comédie en vaudevilles in 1 act, with Achille d'Artois, 1816
- Charles de France, ou Amour et Gloire, opéra comique in 2 acts, with Théaulon, 1816
- Le Calendrier vivant ou Une année dans une heure, with Paul Ledoux and Théaulon, 1817
- Paris à Pékin, ou la Clochette de l'Opéra-Comique, parodie-féerie-folie in 1 act and in vaudevilles, with Théaulon and Marc-Antoine Désaugiers, 1817
- Robinson dans son isle, comedy in 1 act, mingled with couplets and extravaganza, with Michel-Nicolas Balisson de Rougemont, Nicolas Brazier and de Lurieu, 1817
- L'École de village ou l'Enseignement mutuel, 1818
- La Route d'Aix-la-Chapelle, tableau-vaudeville in 1 act, with Théaulon, 1818
- Le Rideau levé, ou le Siège du Parnasse, battle in couplets, with Théaulon, 1818
- Les Perroquets de la mère Philippe, comédie en vaudevilles in 1 act, with Achille d'Artois and Théaulon, 1818
- Monsieur Champagne, ou le Marquis malgré lui, comédie-vaudeville in 1 act, with Théaulon, 1818
- Le Magasin de chaperons, ou l'Opéra-comique vengé, folie-féerie-parodie in 1 act, with Désaugiers, 1818
- Les Bolivars et les Morillos ou les Amours de Belleville, caricatures in action, in 1 act, mingled with vaudevilles, with de Lurieu, 1819
- La Féerie des arts ou le Sultan de Cachemire, folie-féerie vaudeville in 1 act, with Francis and de Lurieu, 1819
- Angéline, ou la Champenoise, comédie en vaudevilles in 1 act, with Emmanuel Théaulon, 1819
- Le Procès de Jeanne-d'Arc, ou le Jury littéraire, with Pierre Carmouche and Henri Dupin, 1819
- Les Troqueurs, with Achille d'Artois, 1819
- Les Visites à Momus, folie-vaudeville in 1 act, with de Lurieu and Francis, 1819
- Les Vêpres odéoniennes, parody of the Vêpres siciliennes, with Antoine Jean-Baptiste Simonnin, 1819
- Le Mariage à la husarde, ou Une nuit de printemps, comedy in 1 act and in prose, mingled with vaudevilles, with W. Lafontaine, 1819
- Le Château de mon oncle ou le Mari par hasard, comedy in 1 act, with Désaugiers, 1819
- Les Trois Vampires ou le Clair de lune, folie-vaudeville in 1 act, with Brazier, 1820
- Le Diable d'Argent, review in 1 act and in vaudevilles, with Théaulon and Edmond Rochefort, 1820
- Clari à Meaux en Brie, pantomime burlesque, précédée de Cadet-Roussel maître de ballets, parade mingled with couplets, with Brazier and Dumersan, 1820
- Le Séducteur champenois, ou les Rhémois, comédie en vaudevilles in 1 act, with Charles Nombret Saint-Laurent and Saintine, 1820
- La Poste dramatique, folie-à-propos de Marie Stuart, sans unité de lieu; in 1 act, in prose, in verses, in couplets and in roulades, with Théaulon, 1820
- La Nina de la rue Vivienne, with de Lurieu and Francis, 1821
- La Solliciteuse, ou l'Intrigue dans les bureaux, comédie en vaudevilles in 1 act, with Théaulon, 1821
- Le Panorama de Paris, ou C'est fête partout !, entertainment in 5 acts, in vaudevilles, 1821
- La Marchande de goujons, ou les Trois Bossus, vaudeville grivois in 1 act, with Francis, 1821
- Le Parnasse gelé, ou les Glisseurs littéraires, folie-revue en 1 act, with Théaulon and Nicolas Gersin, 1821
- Jeanne d'Arc, ou la Délivrance d'Orléans, drame lyrique in 3 acts, with Théaulon, 1821
- Les Blouses ou la Soirée à la mode, comédie en vaudevilles in 1 act, with de Lurieu and Théaulon, 1822
- La Guerre ou la parodie de la paix, tragédie burlesque in 5 acts and in verses, with Théaulon and Laloue, 1822
- Guillaume, Gautier et Garguille ou le Cœur et la Pensée, with Francis and de Lurieu, 1822
- Le Comédien de Paris, comédie en vaudevilles in 1 act, with Eugène de Lamerlière, 1822
- Le Gueux, ou la Parodie du paria, tragédie burlesque in 5 acts and in verse, with Théaulon and Ferdinand Langlé, 1822
- Les Cris de Paris, tableau poissard in 1 act, mingled with couplets, with Francis and Simonnin, 1822
- Le Matin et le Soir, ou la Fiancée et la Mariée, comedy in 2 acts, mingled with couplets, with René de Chazet and Théaulon, 1822
- La Dame des belles cousines, 1823
- La Route de Poissy, comédie en vaudevilles in 1 act, with Francis, 1823
- Le Polichinelle sans le savoir, comédie-parade mingled with couplets, with Armand-François Jouslin de La Salle and Francis, 1823
- La Pauvre Fille, comédie en vaudevilles in 1 act, with Achille d'Artois and Michel Dieulafoy, 1823
- Julien ou Vingt-cinq ans d'entr'acte, comédie en vaudevilles in 2 acts, with Saintine, 1823
- Polichinelle aux eaux d'Enghien, tableau-vaudeville in 1 act, with Francis and Saintine, 1823
- Le Laboureur, ou Tout pour le Roi ! Tout pour la France !, comedy in 1 act and in prose, with Théaulon, 1823
- Les Femmes volantes, vaudeville-féerie in 2 acts, with Achille d'Artois and Théaulon, 1823
- L'Enfant de Paris, ou le Débit de consolations, with Francis and de Lurieu, 1823
- La Route de Poissy, 1823
- L'Orage, comédie en vaudevilles in 1 act, with Saintine, 1823
- La Petite Babet, ou les Deux Gouvernantes, comédie en vaudevilles in 1 act, with Francis, 1823
- La Famille du porteur d'eau, comédie en vaudevilles in 1 act, with Francis, 1824
- L'École des ganaches, with Francis and de Lurieu, 1824
- Thibaut et Justine, ou le Contrat sur le grand chemin, comédie-anecdotique in 1 act, mingled with couplets, with Francis and de Lurieu, 1824
- Le Perruquier et le Coiffeur, comedy in 1 act mingled with couplets, with Dupin and Thomas Sauvage, 1824
- Monsieur le pique assiette, comédie en vaudevilles in 1 act, with de Lurieu and Théaulon, 1824
- L'Imprimeur sans caractère, ou le Classique et le Romantique, with de Lurieu and Francis, 1824
- L'Homme de 60 ans ou la Petite Entêtée, comédie vaudeville in 1 act, with Simonnin and Laloue, 1824
- La Curieuse, comédie en vaudevilles in 2 acts, with Achille d'Artois and X-B de Saintine, 1824
- Les Personnalités, ou le Bureau des cannes, vaudeville épisodique in 1 act, with Francis and de Lurieu, 1824
- Les Deux Jockos, mimickery in 1 act, mingled with couplets, with Francis and de Lurieu, 1825
- L'Ami intime, comedy in 1 act, mingled with couplets, with Théaulon, 1825
- Les Lorrains, with Francis and de Lurieu, 1825
- Le Saint-Henri, entertainment, with Théodore Anne, 1825
- Le Champenois, ou les Mystifications, comédie en vaudevilles in 1 act, with Achille d'Artois and Francis, 1825
- La Grand'Maman, ou le Lendemain de noces, comédie en vaudevilles in 1 act, with Achille d'Artois and Francis, 1825
- Le Commissaire du bal, ou l'Ancienne et la Nouvelle Mode, comédie-anecdote mingled with vaudevilles, in 1 act, with Francis, 1825
- France et Savoie, comédie en vaudevilles in 2 acts, with Théaulon, 1825
- La Léocadie de Pantin, parodie de la Léocadie by Feydeau, with Dupin and Varner, 1825
- Les Inconvéniens de la diligence, ou Monsieur Bonnaventure, 6 tableaux-vaudeville in the same setting, with Francis, 1826
- Le Candidat, ou l'Athénée de Beaune, comédie en vaudevilles in 5 acts, with Théaulon and Francis baron d'Allarde, 1826
- Le Capitaliste malgré lui, comédie en vaudevilles in 1 act, with Francis and X.-B. Saintine, 1826
- Le Prisonnier amateur, comedy mingled with couplets, with Frédérick Lemaître, Alexis Decomberousse and Laloue, 1826
- Le Protecteur, comédie en vaudevilles in 1 act, with Francis and Théaulon, 1826
- Les Trous à la lune, ou Apollon en faillite, à-propos-folie in 1 act, with Francis and Théaulon, 1826
- Le Baron allemand, ou le Blocus de la salle à manger, with Gabriel de Lurieu, comédie en vaudevilles in 1 act, 1826
- Le Centenaire, ou la Famille des Gaillards, comédie en vaudevilles in 1 act, with Francis and Théaulon, 1826
- Les Jolis Soldats, tableau militaire, civil and vaudeville, imitated from Charlet, with Francis, 1826
- Le Médecin des théâtres, ou les Ordonnances, tableau épisodique in 1 act, with Théaulon and Francis, 1826
- M. François, ou Chacun sa manie, comedy in 1 act, mingled with couplets, with Francis, 1826
- Figaro ou le Jour de noces, play in 3 acts, after Beaumarchais, with Felice Blangini, 1827
- La Halle au blé ou l'Amour et la Morale, with Francis and Charles Nombret Saint-Laurent, 1827
- L'Homme de Paille, comedy in 1 act, mingled with vaudevilles, with Achille d'Artois and Francis, 1827
- Paris et Londres, comedy imitated from English, in 4 tableaux, with Mathurin-Joseph Brisset, 1827
- Le Futur de la grand'maman, comedy in 1 act, mingled with couplets, with Achille d'Artois and Édouard Monnais, 1827
- Clara Wendel, comédie en vaudevilles in 2 acts, with Francis and Théaulon, 1827
- La Nuit d'un joueur, ou le Petit Béverley, with de Lurieu and Joseph Aude, 1827
- La Villageoise somnambule, ou les Deux Fiancés, comédie en vaudevilles en 3 acts, with Dupin, 1827
- Les Deux Matelots, ou le Père malgré lui, comédie en vaudevilles in 1 act, with Francis, 1827
- Cartouche et Mandrin, comédie en vaudevilles in 1 act, with Henri Dupin, 1827
- Mon ami Pierre, with de Leuven and Auguste Pittaud de Forges, 1827
- Le Bon Père, comedy in 1 act, by Florian, arranged in vaudeville, with Achille d'Artois and Ferdinand Laloue, 1827
- Les Forgerons, comédie en vaudevilles in 2 acts, with Achille d'Artois and Francis, 1827
- Les Trois Faubourgs, ou le Samedi, le Dimanche et le Lundi, comédie en vaudevilles in 3 acts, with Francis and Théaulon, 1827
- Le Bourgeois de Paris, ou la Partie de plaisir, play in 3 acts and 5 tableaux, with Henri Dupin and Antoine-François Varner, 1828
- Le Caporal et le Paysan, with Alphonse Signol, 1828
- Le Portefeuille, with de Lurieu and de Forges, 1828
- Jean Pacot, ou Cinq ans d'un conscrit, comédie en vaudevilles in 5 acts, with Francis, 1828
- Le Château de M. le baron, comédie en vaudevilles in 2 acts, with Charles de Livry, 1828
- Le Brigand napolitain, with Adolphe de Leuven and de Forges, 1829
- Le Dernier Jour d'un condamné, époque de la vie d'un romantique, in 1 tableau, with a prologue in verse, with Victor Hugo, Michel Masson and Mathieu Barthélemy Thouin, 1829
- La Veille et le Lendemain ou Il faut bien aimer son mari, comédie en vaudevilles in 2 acts, with Achille d'Artois and Francis, 1829
- Les Suites d'un mariage de raison, with Victor Lhérie, 1829
- Les Enragés, tableau villageois in 1 act, with Brazier, 1829
- Les Mémoires contemporains, ou la Maison des fous, à propos in 1 act mingled with couplets, with de Lurieu and Masson, 1829
- La Grisette mariée, comédie en vaudevilles in 2 acts, with Charles-François-Jean-Baptiste Moreau de Commagny and Louis-Émile Vanderburch, 1829
- Monsieur de la Jobardière ou la Révolution impromptue, comedy in 1 act mingled with couplets, with Dupin and Dumersan, 1830
- Tom-Rick, ou le Babouin, play in 3 acts imitated from English, with Francis Cornu, and Francis, 1832
- La Femme du peuple, drama in 2 acts, mingled with couplets, with Dumersan, 1835
- Roger, ou le Curé de Champaubert, drama-vaudeville in 2 acts, with Julien de Mallian, 1835
- La Laitière et les Deux Chasseurs, ou l'Ours, le ballon, la grenouille et le pot au lait, imitated from Duni and Anseaume, with Félix-Auguste Duvert, Augustin-Théodore de Lauzanne de Vauroussel and X.-B. Saintine, 1837
- Nanon, Ninon et Maintenon ou les Trois Boudoirs, comedy in 3 acts, with Théaulon and Jean-Pierre Lesguillon, 1839
- Je m'en moque comme de l'an 40, review in 1 act, with Théaulon, 1839
- Valentine, comédie en vaudevilles in 2 acts, with Achille d'Artois, 1839
- Vingt-six ans, comedy in 2 acts and in prose, with Achille d'Artois, 1839
- Deux Systèmes, comédie en vaudevilles in 2 acts mingled with couplets, 1840
- Le Dompteur de bêtes féroces, folie-vaudeville in 1 act, with Théaulon, 1840
- Un jeune caissier, drama in 3 acts and in prose, awith Théaulon, 1840
- Une veuve de la grande armée, play in 4 acts, mingled with couplets, with Théaulon and Clairville, 1841
- Mme Gibou et Mme Pochet, ou le Thé chez la ravaudeuse, pièce grivoise in 3 acts, with Dumersan, 1841
- Le Flagrant Délit, comédie en vaudevilles in 1 act, with Edmond de Biéville, 1841
- Le Héros du marquis de quinze sous, comédie en vaudevilles in 3 acts, with de Biéville, 1843
- Une Idée de médecin, comedy in 1 act mingled with couplets, with Achille d'Artois, 1844
- Les Mystères de Passy, parody-vaudeville in 11 tableaux, 5 acts, with prologue and epilogue, with Rochefort, 1844
- La Gardeuse de dindons, comédie en vaudevilles in 3 acts, with de Biéville, 1845
- Un domestique pour tout faire, comédie en vaudevilles in 1 act, with Achille d'Artois, 1846
- La Fille obéissante, comédie en vaudevilles in 1 act, with Achille d'Artois, 1846
- Un Monsieur qui veut exister, comédie en vaudevilles in 1 act, with Achille d'Artois, 1849
- Les Saisons vivantes, with Roger de Beauvoir, 1850
- Une nuit orageuse, comédie en vaudevilles in 2 acts, with Jules Adenis, 1852
- Reculer pour mieux sauter, proverbe-vaudeville in 1 act, with Achille d'Artois, 1854

He also authored several songs.
