= Léonard Tousez =

French actor and playwright (1788-1826)

- Born: 1788; Paris, France
- Died: 1826 (aged 37–38); Charenton, France

Léonard Décade Tousez (French pronunciation: [leɔnaʁ dekaːd tusɛ]; 1788–1826) was a French actor and playwright of the 19th century.

== Biography ==
Tousez was born in Paris. An actor at the Théâtre des Variétés (1816-1826), he played the handsome young men in Les Bolivars et les Morillos ou Les amours de Belleville (1819) by Armand d'Artois and Gabriel de Lurieu as well as, inter alia, in Le témoin ou La Porte-Maillot (1820) by Eugène Scribe, Mélesville and Xavier Boniface.

In 1818, he married Charlotte Zoë Régnier de la Brière, an actress and François-Joseph Regnier's mother.

He took part in the composition of several plays of the boulevard theatre genre which were presented at the Théâtre du Gymnase dramatique and the Théâtre du Vaudeville.

He lost reason while performing in 1826 and died in the asylum at Charenton.

== Works ==
- 1820: Les bons gendarmes, poème épique en deux chants, with Charles Odry
- 1823: L'atelier de peinture, tableau-vaudeville in 1 act, with Sewrin
- 1823: Le Chevalier d'honneur, comedy in 1 act, mingled with vaudevilles, with Sewrin and Nicolas Gersin
- 1823: Le Lithographe, ou les Scènes populaires, vaudeville in 1 act, with Sewrin
- 1825: Le Point d'honneur, vaudeville in 1 act, with Benjamin Antier

== Bibliography ==
- François-Antoine Harel, Dictionnaire théâtral ou, douze cent trente-trois vérités..., 1824, p. 197
- Maurice Alhoy, Grande biographie dramatique, ou Silhouette des acteurs..., 1824, p. 214 (Read on line)
- Henry Lyonnet, Dictionnaire des comédiens français, 1911, p. 687
