= Joseph Servières =

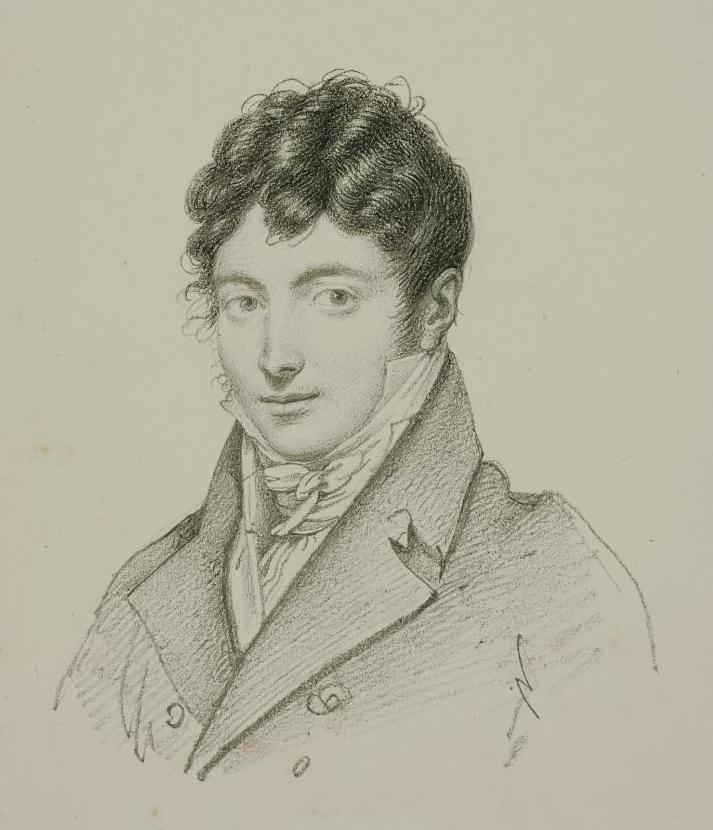
- Jean-Baptiste Wicar, Portrait of Joseph Servières, 1810 (Rome, Museo napoleonico)
- Born: 20 July 1781; Figeac, France
- Died: 3 February 1826 (aged 44); 10th arrondissement of Paris, France
- Occupation: Playwright
- Spouse: Eugénie Charen

Joseph Servières (20 July 1781 – 3 February 1826) was an early 19th-century French playwright.

== Biography ==
After studying in his hometown, Servières came to Paris at a very young age. Soon after his arrival, he wrote and staged several theatre plays which achieved some success. He was noticed by Lucien Bonaparte, then interior minister, but soon fell into Napoleon's disfavor. In 1807, he married Eugénie Charen, the stepdaughter of the painter Guillaume Guillon Lethière, who was herself a distinguished artist. Servières then accompanied his stepfather to Italy, where the latter had been appointed Director of the French School in Rome. There he met Lucien, a longtime friend and confidant of Lethière.

Servières returned to Paris in 1812 and obtained a position in the public treasury. Under the Restoration, he was appointed a public auditor at the Court of Audit on 8 September 1818. He kept on writing plays until his death.

== Works ==
- 1800: Les dieux à Tivoli, ou l’Ascension de l’Olympe, folie non-fastueuse, arlequinade-impromptu in 1 act and comédie en vaudevilles, Paris, in-8°, with Étienne, Morel and Francis baron d'Allarde
- 1801: Le Bouquet de pensées pour l’an X, in-8°
- 1801: La Martingale, ou le Serret de gagner au jeu, arlequinade-vaudeville in 1 act, in prose, Paris, in-8°, with Francis and Belargey
- 1801: Le Père malgré lui, comédie-vaudeville in 1 act and in prose, with R. Philidor [Rochelle]
- 1801: Le Télégraphe d’amour, comedy in 1 act, in prose, mingled with vaudevilles, with Charles Henrion
- 1801: Rembrandt, ou la Vente après décès, one-act vaudeville anecdotique, with Étienne, Morel and Moras
- 1802:Fontenelle, one-act comédie-anecdote, in prose and vaudevilles, with Petit ainé
- 1803: Monsieur Botte, ou le Négociant anglais, comedy in 3 acts and in prose, imitated from the novel by Pigault-Lebrun, with Ernest de Clonard and François Grille
- 1803: Manon la ravaudeuse, one-act vaudeville, mingled with vaudevilles, with Désaugiers and Charles Henrion
- 1803: Fanchon la vielleuse de retour dans ses montagnes, three-act comedy, mingled with vaudevilles, with Joseph Aude
- 1804: Les Charbonniers de la Forêt noire, three-act comedy, mingled with vaudevilles, with Sewrin and Lafortelle
- 1803: Drelindindin, ou le carillonneur de la Samaritaine, one-act parade, mingled with vaudevilles; premiered at Théâtre de la Cité-Variétés, 23 brumaire an 11, with Charles Henrion
- 1803: Jean Bart, one-act historical comedy, in prose and vaudevilles, with Duval and Ligier;
- 1804: Un quart d’heure d’un sage, one-act vaudeville, with F.-P.-A. Léger
- 1804: Jocrisse suicidé, tragicomic drama in 1 act and in prose, with Sidoni
- 1804: Brisquet et Jolicœur, one-act vaudeville, with Dumaniant
- 1804: Bombarde, ou les Marchands de chansons, parody of Ossian, ou les Bardes, mélodrame lyrique in 5 acts, with Daudet and Léger
- 1804: La Belle Milanaise, ou la Fille femme, page et soldat, three-act melodrama, extravaganza, with Charles Henrion
- 1804: Le Dansomane de la rue Quincampoix, ou le Bal interrompu, one-act folie-vaudeville, with Moreau
- 1805: Jeanneton colère, one-act vaudeville grivois, with G. Duval
- 1805: Les Nouvelles Métamorphoses, one-act vaudeville, with Antoine-Marie Coupart
- 1806: Alphonsine, ou la Tendresse maternelle, melodrama in 3 acts and in prose, from the novel by Félicité de Genlis, with Dumersan
- 1806: Madame Scarron, one-act comédie-vaudeville, with Désaugiers
- 1807: Monsieur Giraffe, ou la Mort de l’ours blanc, one-act vaudeville, par M. Bernard, de la rue aux Ours, with Dumersan, Desaugiers and five other collaborators
- 1807: Arlequin double, one-act vaudeville, with Desaugiers
- 1809: La pièce qui n’en est pas une, dialogue analogue aux prologues et épilogues, with Georges Duval and Bonnel
- 1804: Toujours le même, one-act vaudeville, Paris, Théâtre Montansier, 12 fructidor an XII, with Antoine-Marie Coupart
- 1826: Chansons nouvelles, Paris, chez les Principaux Libraires, in-8°

Two other plays are attributed to Servières: L’Amant comédien and Les trois n’en font qu’un, as well as an essay entitled Revue des théâtres. Several songs from his comedies have been inserted in the Chansonnier français and other lyrical collections.

== Sources ==
- Michaud, Louis-Gabriel (1849). Biographie universelle, ancienne et moderne; Supplément ou histoire, par ordre alphabétique, de la vie publique et privée de tous les hommes qui se sont fait remarquer par leurs écrits, leurs actions, leurs talents, leurs vertus ou leurs crimes (in French). Vol. 82. Paris: Michaud. pp. 152, 445..
