= Charles Nombret Saint-Laurent =

French dramatist and librettist (1791–1833)

Laurent-Charles Nombret Saint-Laurent (2 July 1791 at Bergues – 30 July 1833 at Boulogne-sur-Mer) was a French dramatist and librettist. An administrator at the Ponts-et-chaussées, he has authored some vaudevilles which have been performed on the most important parisian stages of the 19th century : Théâtre des Nouveautés, Théâtre des Variétés, Théâtre du Vaudeville etc.

== Works ==
- 1820 : Le séducteur champenois, ou Les Rhémois, comédie en vaudevilles in 1 act, with Saintine and Armand d'Artois
- 1823 : Les Couturières, ou le Cinquième au-dessus de l'entresol, tableau-vaudeville in 1 act, with Marc-Antoine Désaugiers and X.-B. Saintine
- 1824 : Pinson, père de famille, ou la Suite de Je fais mes farces , folie-vaudeville in 1 act, with Désaugiers
- 1825 : Brelan d'amoureux, ou les Trois soufflets, vaudeville in 1 act, with Saintine and Jean-Baptiste-Rose-Bonaventure Violet d'Épagny
- 1827 : La halle au blé ou L'amour et la morale, with Francis and Armand d'Artois
- 1827 : Les Cartes de visite, ou Une fête de famille, vaudeville in 1 act, with Saintine
- 1827 : Les Dames peintres, ou l'Atelier à la mode, tableau in 1 act, mingled with couplets, with Gabriel de Lurieu
- 1827 : John Bull au Louvre, vaudeville in 3 tableaux, with Théaulon and Jean-François-Alfred Bayard
- 1827 : Le Mari par intérim, comédie en vaudevilles in 1 act, with Fulgence de Bury and Henri de Tully
- 1829 : Le bandit, play in 2 acts mingled with songs, with Théodore Anne and Emmanuel Théaulon
- 1829 : Le Moulin de Bayard, historical vaudeville in one act, with de Bury
- 1830 : Bonaparte, lieutenant d'artillerie, ou 1789 et 1800, historical comedy in two acts, mingled with couplets
- 1830 : Le Mardi-gras et le lendemain, ou Vivent la joie et les pommes de terre, esquisse in 1 act and a half
- 1831 : Le Boa, ou le Bossu à la mode, comédie en vaudevilles in 1 act
- 1836 : Le coiffeur et le perruquier, vaudeville in one act, with Édouard-Joseph-Ennemond Mazères and Eugène Scribe
- 1844 : Le Roman de la pension, comedy mingled with vaudeville, with Bayard

== Bibliography ==
- Joseph-Marie Quérard, La France littéraire, 1836, p. 445
- Charles Weiss, Biographie universelle, 1841, p. 395-396
- Camille Dreyfus, André Berthelot, La Grande encyclopédie, 1886, p. 1186
