= Antoine-Pierre-Charles Favart =

French painter

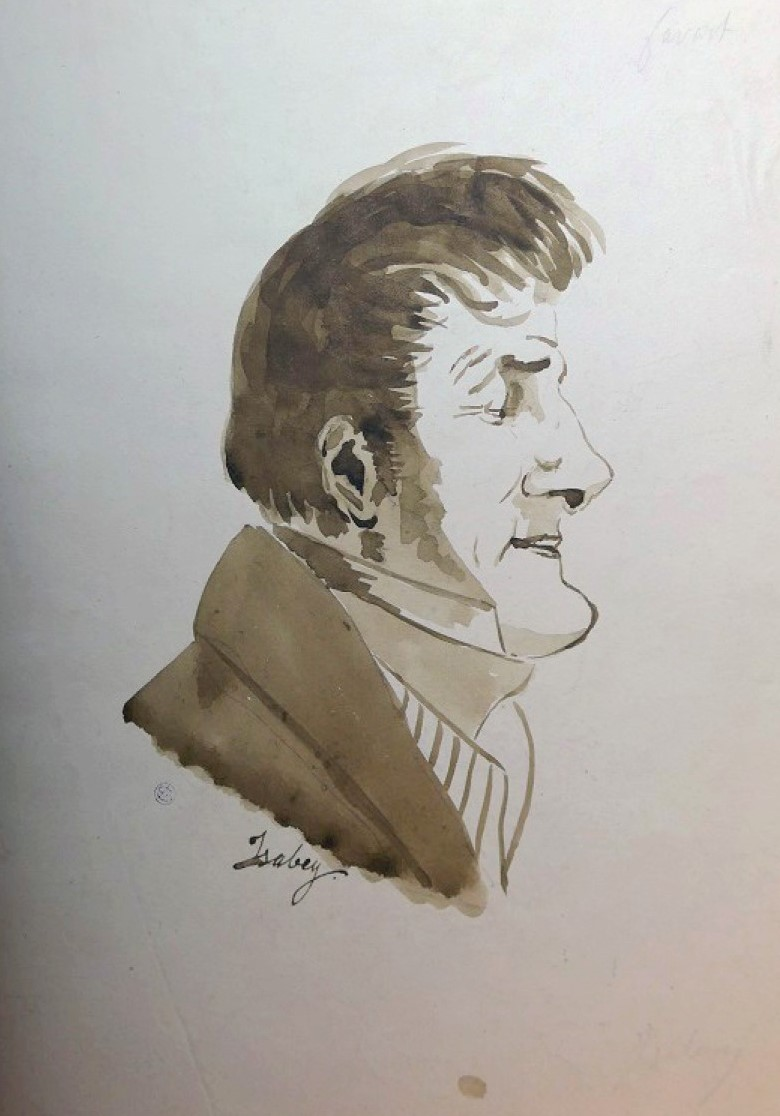
- Portrait of Antoine-Pierre-Charles Favart by Jean-Baptiste Isabey.
- Born: 6 October 1780; Paris, France
- Died: 28 March 1867 (aged 86); Paris, France

Antoine-Pierre-Charles Favart (6 October 1780 – 28 March 1867) was a 19th-century French playwright, painter, engraver and diplomat.

== Biography ==
Favart was born in Paris in 1784. He was the grandson of Charles-Simon Favart and Marie Justine Benoite Duronceray, a celebrated actress of her time. Favart's father, Charles Nicolas Joseph Favart, was also a dramatist and an actor.

Favart's works were published, his own plays were presented at Théâtre du Vaudeville. He also participated as costume designer to other boulevard plays such as Le sultan du Havre by Armand d'Artois and Henri Dupin (1810). Favart also edited his grandfather's Memoires.

He entered the French diplomatic service, where he gained some distinction. He became a consul of France in Russia, secretary of the Duke of Caraman and the Duke de Polignac, in charge of diplomatic missions, he established ties with the playwright and poet Aleksey Konstantinovich Tolstoy of whom he made an oil portrait in 1846. He has left many caricatures in the press and portraits for the Galerie théâtrale. He was afterward appointed a consul in Mons (Belgium).

A student of Joseph-Benoît Suvée, he took part to the Salon of Paris from 1806 to 1839.

== Works ==
- 1808: La Jeunesse de Favart, one-act comédie anecdotique, in prose, mingled with comédie en vaudevilles, with Michel-Joseph Gentil de Chavagnac
- 1809: Le rival par amitié, comedy in 1 act and in prose, mingled with vaudevilles, with Henri-François Dumolard
- 1809: Roger-Bontemps, ou La fête des fous, with Henri Dupin
- 1810: Les six pantoufles ou Le rendez-vous des Cendrillons, folie-vaudeville in 1 act and in prose, with Armand d'Artois and Henri Dupin

== Bibliography ==
- Gustave Vapereau, Dictionnaire universel des contemporains, 1861, (p. 635) (read online)
- Nouvelle biographie universelle, 1873, (p. 211)
- Amédée Marandet, Manuscrits de la famille Favart, 1922, (p. 40)
- Emmanuel Bénézit, Dictionnaire critique et documentaire des peintres, 1913, (p. 275)
