= Édouard-Joseph-Ennemond Mazères =

French playwright and librettist (1796–1866)

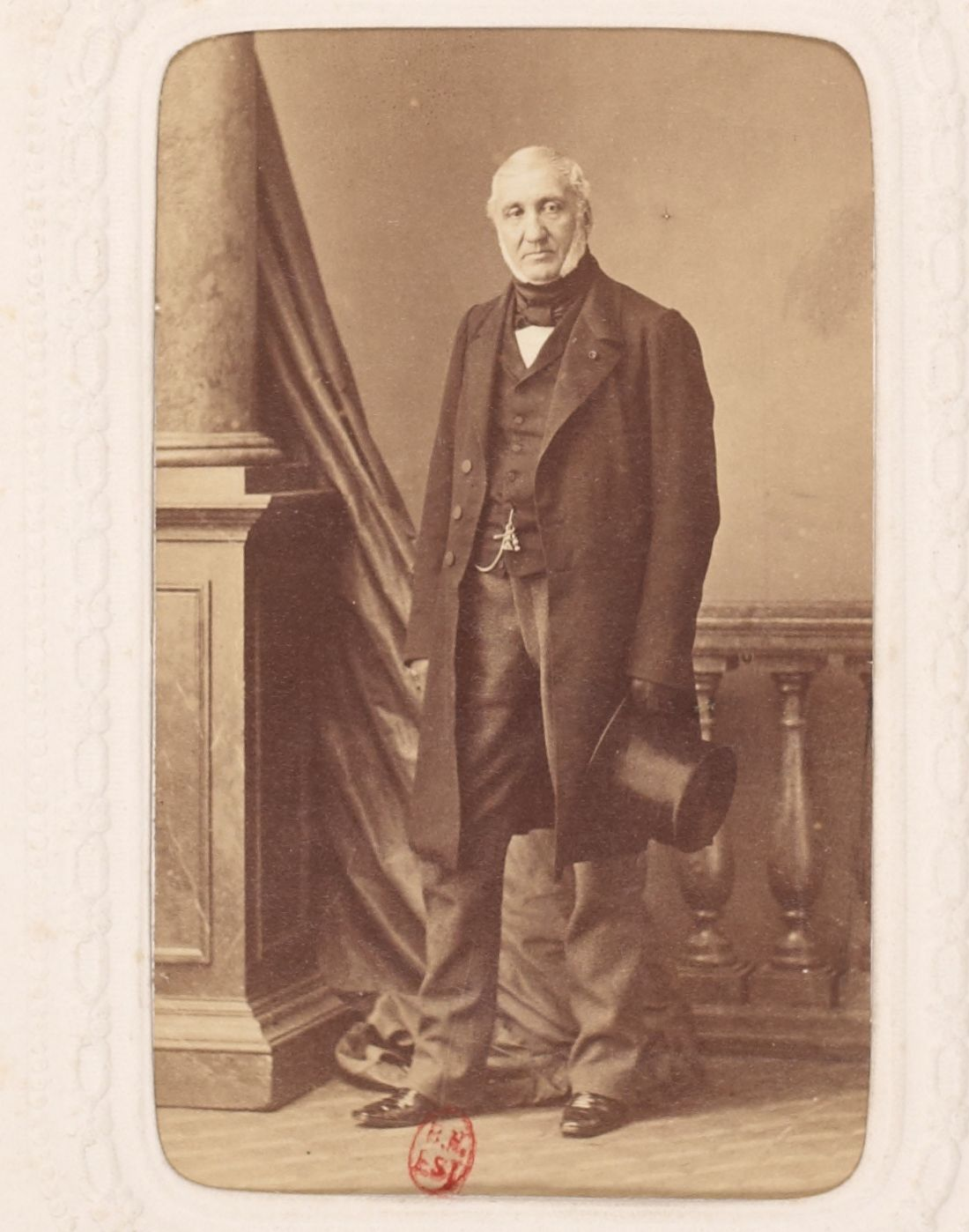
Mazères

Édouard-Joseph-Ennemond Mazères (11 September 1796, Paris – 19 March 1866, Paris) was a 19th-century French playwright and librettist.

== Biography ==
A son of a French colonist of Saint-Domingue, he studied in Paris then joined the army. Lieutenant of infantry, he resigned in 1820 to concentrate on literature. He became Charles X's lecturer but had to leave the post during the July Revolution. In 1832, he was raised to the position of sous-préfet of Saint-Denis, then prefect of Ariège (1835), Aveyron (1837), Haute-Saône (1839) and Cher (1847–1848).

His plays, many of which he wrote with Eugène Scribe, were performed on the most important stages of the Parisian theatre of the 19th century: Théâtre du Gymnase, Théâtre de Madame, Théâtre de l'Odéon, Comédie-Française, Théâtre du Vaudeville, etc.

== Works ==
- 1821: L'Album, comedy vaudeville in 1 act, with Louis-Benoît Picard
- 1821: Un jour a Rome, ou Le jeune homme en loterie, with G. de Lurieu
- 1821: Monsieur M. Sensible, comedy vaudeville in 1 act
- 1821: Le Panorama d'Athènes, tableau in couplets
- 1822: L'Amateur à la porte, ou la Place du Louvre, vaudeville in 1 act
- 1822: Le Notaire, comedy-vaudeville in 1 act
- 1822: Une heure de veuvage, comedy-vaudeville
- 1823: La loge du portier, comedy-vaudeville, with Scribe
- 1823: Rossini à Paris, ou Le grand dîner, à propos-vaudeville in 1 act, with Scribe
- 1823: Le bureau de la Loterie, comedy-vaudeville in 1 act, with Auguste Romieu
- 1823: La Vérité dans le vin, comedy-vaudeville in 1 act, with Scribe
- 1824: Le coiffeur et le perruquier, vaudeville in 1 act, with Charles Nombret Saint-Laurent and Eugène Scribe
- 1824: L'Enfant trouvé, comedy in 3 acts, with Picard
- 1824: Les Petites saturnales, comedy in 1 act, mixed with couplets
- 1825: Le landau ou L'hospitalité, comedy-vaudeville in 1 act, with Picard
- 1825: Le Charlatanisme, comedy-vaudeville, with Scribe
- 1825: Les Arrangeuses, ou les Pièces mises en pièces, folie-vaudeville in 1 act, with Nicolas Gersin and Gabriel de Lurieu
- 1825: L'éligible, comedy in 1 act, with G. de Lurieu et Thomas Sauvage
- 1825: La Quarantaine, comedy vaudeville
- 1826: La Coutume allemande, ou les Vacances, comedy vaudeville in 1 act
- 1826: La Demoiselle de compagnie, comedy-vaudeville in 1 act, with Picard
- 1826: La Fin du mois, comedy-vaudeville in 1 act
- 1826: Héritage et mariage, comedy in 3 acts, with Picard
- 1826: Le jeune mari, comedy in 3 acts
- 1827: Le loup-garou, with Scribe, opéra comique by Louise Bertin in 1 act
- 1827: Les trois quartiers, comedie in 3 acts, with Picard
- 1828: Chacun de son coté, comedy in 3 acts
- 1828: Les Éphémères, tragi-comedy in 3 acts in prose, preceded with a prologue and followed with an epilogue, with Picard
- 1828: L'Espion, drama in five acts, with Jacques-Arsène-François-Polycarpe Ancelot
- 1828: L'oncle d'Amérique, comedy-vaudeville, with Scribe
- 1829: Le Bon garçon, comedy in 3 acts in prose, with Picard
- 1830: La Dame et la demoiselle, comedy in 4 acts in prose, with Adolphe-Simonis Empis
- 1830: La mère et la fille, comedy in 5 acts, with Empis
- 1830: Vatel ou le petit fils d'un grand homme, comedy vaudeville in 1 act, with Scribe
- 1831: Un changement de ministère, comedy in 5 acts and in prose, with Empis
- 1834: Une liaison, 5-act comedy, with Empis
- 1849: L'Amitié des femmes, 3-act comedy, in prose
- 1851: Le collier de perles, 3-act comedy
- 1854: La Niaise, 4-act comedy

== Distinction ==
- Officer of the Ordre national de la Légion d'honneur, 17 October 1832.

== Bibliography ==
- Charles Dezobry, Théodore Bachelet, Dictionnaire général de biographie et d'histoire, 1869, p. 2953
- Gustave Vapereau, Dictionnaire universel des contemporains, vol. 2, 1870, p. 1239
- Joseph Marie Quérard, Antoine Alexandre Barbier, Les supercheries littéraires dévoilées, 1874, p. 139
- Ferdinand Natanael Staaff, La littérature française depuis la formation de la langue jusqu'à nos jours, vol. 2, 1878, p. 1065
- Patrick Berthier, Le théâtre au XIXe siècle, 1986, p. 78
