= Étienne Jourdan =

French dramaturge

Étienne Jourdan (? – Paris, 9 March 1847), was a 19th-century French playwright, engraver and chansonnier.

An engraver, member of the caveau moderne, he wrote some theatre plays given at the Théâtre de l'Ambigu-Comique, the Théâtre du Vaudeville and the Théâtre de la Gaîté as well as a collection of songs of which the best known is La Goguette. Some of his couplets, published in the Paris press, were famous political diatribes.

== Works ==
- 1813: Le Boghey renversé, ou Un point de vue de Longchamp, croquis en vaudevilles, with Emmanuel Théaulon and Armand d'Artois
- 1814: La cocarde blanche, one-act comedy in prose
- 1834: Artiste et artisan, ou les Deux expositions, one-act comédie-vaudeville, with Ferdinand de Laboullaye
- 1836: Le Barde, collection of songs
- 1836: L'Ouverture sans prologue, prologue d'ouverture in 1 act, mingled with vaudevilles, with de Laboullaye

== Bibliography ==
- Joseph Marie Quérard, Félix Bourquelot, Charles Louandre, La littérature française contemporaine. XIXe, 1852, (p. 426)
