= Alexis Wafflard =

French playwright

- Born: Alexis Jacques Marie Wafflard; 29 June 1787; Versailles, France
- Died: 1 December 1824 (aged 37); Paris, France
- Occupation: Playwright

Alexis Wafflard, real name Alexis Jacques Marie Wafflard, or Vafflard, (29 June 1787 – 1 December 1824) was a French playwright, known in his lifetime for his comedies related to bourgeoises mores.

His comedy Les Caméléons, written in collaboration with the chansonnier Pierre-Jean de Béranger, is a satire of bureaucracy. His most popular work, written in collaboration with Fulgence de Bury, is Le Voyage à Dieppe. Wafflard died aged 37 from a pulmonary disease.

== Theatre ==
- Haydn ou le Menuet du bœuf, comédie-anecdote in 1 act, mingled with vaudevilles, with Jules Joseph de Lurieu called Gabriel, Paris, Théâtre du Vaudeville, 12 November 1812
- Le Voile d'Angleterre, ou la Revendeuse à la toilette, comédie en vaudevilles in 1 act, with Charles-François-Jean-Baptiste Moreau de Commagny, Paris, Théâtre du Vaudeville, 14 March 1814.
- Les Caméléons, comédie en vaudevilles in 1 act, in prose, with Charles-François-Jean-Baptiste Moreau de Commagny and Pierre-Jean de Béranger, Paris, Théâtre du Vaudeville, 25 October 1815
- Une promenade à St-Cloud, bluette épisodique in 1 act, mingled with vaudevilles, with Antoine-Achille-J. Rouval, Paris, Théâtre du Vaudeville, 10 September 1817
- Un moment d'imprudence, comedy in 3 acts and in prose, with Fulgence de Bury, Paris, Second Théâtre-Français, 1 December 1819
- Le Voyage à Dieppe, comedy in 3 acts and in prose, with Fulgence de Bury, Paris, Second Théâtre-Français, 1 March 1821
- Un jeu de bourse, ou la Bascule, comedy in 1 act, in prose, with Louis-Benoît Picard and Fulgence de Bury, Paris, Théâtre du Gymnase-dramatique, 26 July 1821
- Le Célibataire et l'homme marié, comedy in 3 acts and in prose, with Fulgence de Bury, Paris, Second Théâtre-Français, 16 December 1822
- Les Deux Ménages, comedy in 3 acts, with Louis-Benoît Picard and Fulgence de Bury Paris, Second Théâtre-Français, 21 March 1822
- L'Écolier d'Oxford, comedy in 3 acts and in prose, Paris, Second Théâtre-Français, 29 July 1824

== Sources ==
- Ferdinand Hoefer, Nouvelle Biographie générale, vol. XLVI, 1866.
- Pierre Larousse, Grand Dictionnaire universel du XIXe siècle, vol. XV, 1870.
