= Wafflard =

Wafflard is a surname. Notable people with the surname include:

- Alexis Wafflard, French playwright
- Jean-Pierre Wafflard (born 1968), Belgian wrestler
