= Adolphe Choquart =

French librettist

Adolphe Anne François Choquart (Toulouse, 12 February 1800 – after 1859) was a 19th-century French writer, librettist and playwright.

A cavalry captain then a bodyguard, his plays were presented on the Parisian stages of the 19th century, including the Théâtre du Vaudeville, the Théâtre de l'Opéra-Comique and the Théâtre des Nouveautés.

Alexandre Dumas said of him that he was the last of the musketeers.

== Works ==
- 1827: M. Jovial, ou l'Huissier Chansonnier, two-act comédie-vaudeville, with Emmanuel Théaulon
- 1828: Monsieur Ducroquis, ou peintre en voyage, two-act comédie-vaudeville, with Théaulon
- 1833: Le corridor du Puits de l'Ermite, tales of Sainte-Pélagie, with Georges Guénot
- 1834: Claude Bélissan, one-act tableau-vaudeville, with Théaulon
- 1841: Lettre d'un conscrit à sa mère
- 1842: Madame Barbe-bleue, two-act comédie-vaudeville
- 1847: En carnaval, one-act pochade, with Charles Varin
- 1850: Le talisman, one-act opéra comique, with Varin
- 1859: Silhouettes philosophiques. Profils militaires et fantaisies
