= Eugénie Servières =

French painter (1786–1855)

Eugénie Honorée Marguerite Servières
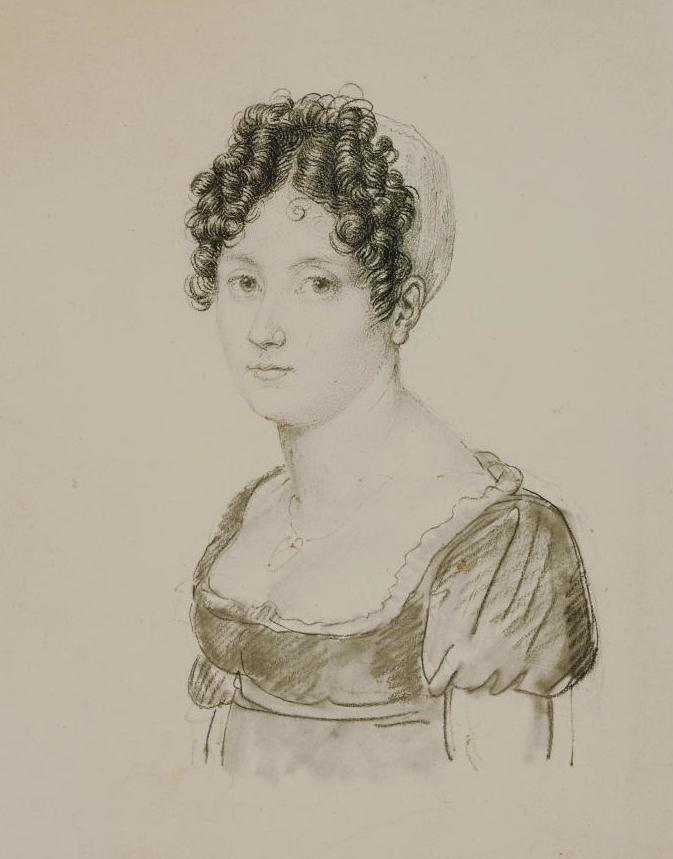
- Eugénie Servières, by Jean-Baptiste Wicar, c.1810
- Born: Eugénie Honorée Marguerite Charen; 1786; Paris
- Died: 1855 (aged 68–69); Paris
- Spouse: Joseph Servières (m. 1807)

Eugénie Honorée Marguerite Servières, née Charen (1786 – 20 March 1855) was a French painter in the Troubadour style. She specialized in genre period paintings.

== Biography ==
In 1807 she married the playwright Joseph Servières. She trained with her stepfather, Guillaume Guillon-Lethière, Director of the French Academy in Rome.

Beginning in 1808, she exhibited her paintings, on a wide variety of subjects, in several venues. In 1808 and 1817, The Paris Salon awarded her medals. In 1825, she displayed two works at the Salon in Lille.

Her paintings include Hagar in the Desert, Lancelot and Genevieve, Louis XIII and Mlle. de Lafayette, Alain Chartier and Marguerite d'Écosse, Valentine de Milan, Desdemona Singing the Romance of the Willow, and Blanche de Castille Delivering the Prisoners of Châtenay.

Her Mathilde converts Malek-Adhel to Christianity (1812, from a novel about the Crusades by Sophie Cottin) was purchased by the Empress Marie Louise for her personal collection, while the evocative Inez de Castro and her Children at the feet of the King of Portugal is preserved at the Trianon Palace at Versailles, near Paris.

Most of her works were personally commissioned, and very few are in museums. She had several students.

== Selected paintings ==
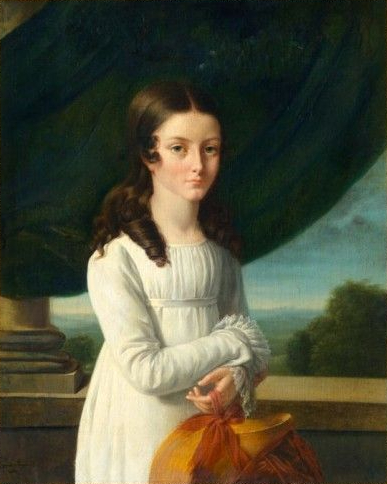
Young Woman on a Balcony (1812)

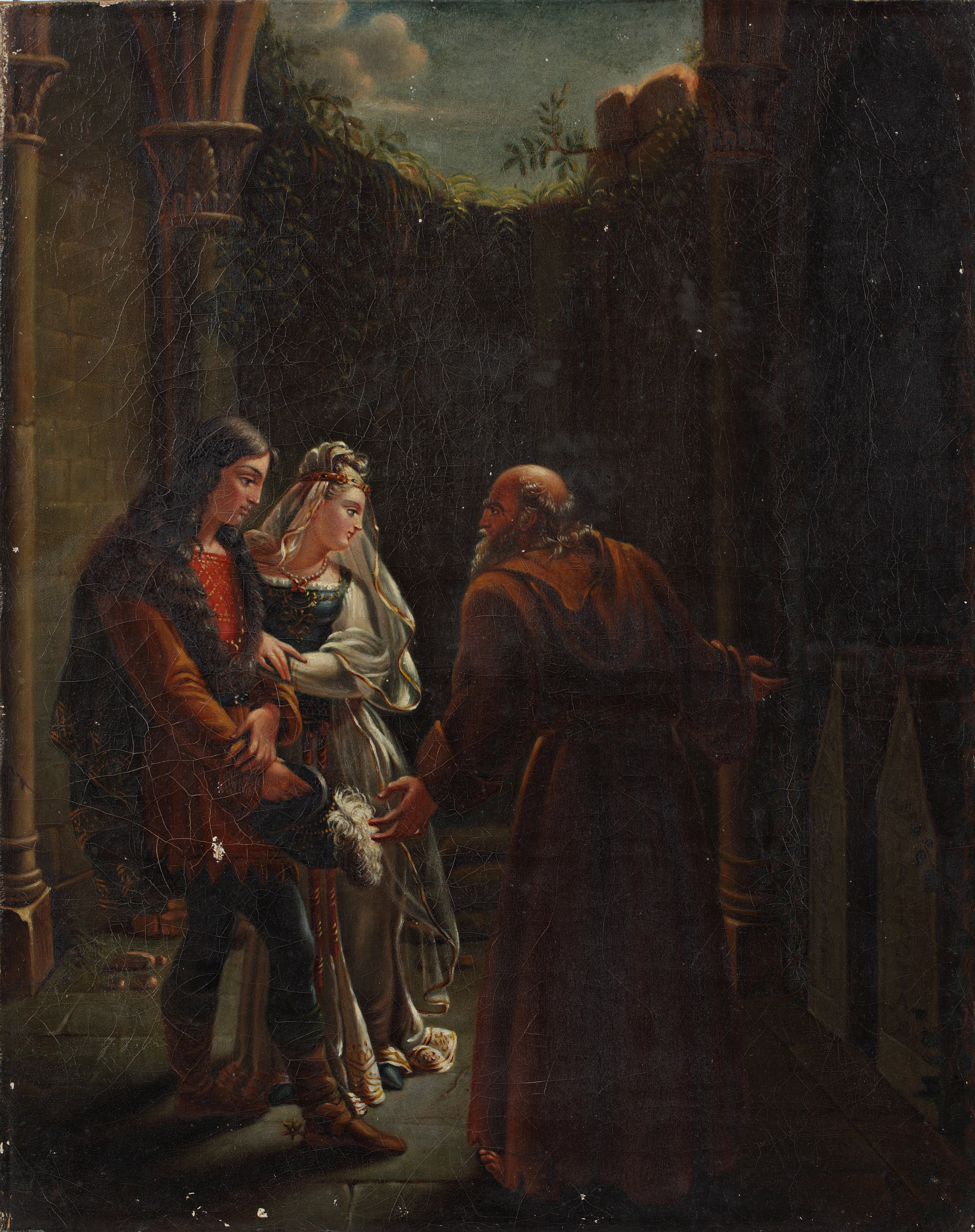
Geneviève and Lancelot at the Tombs of Tristan and Isolde (c. 1814)

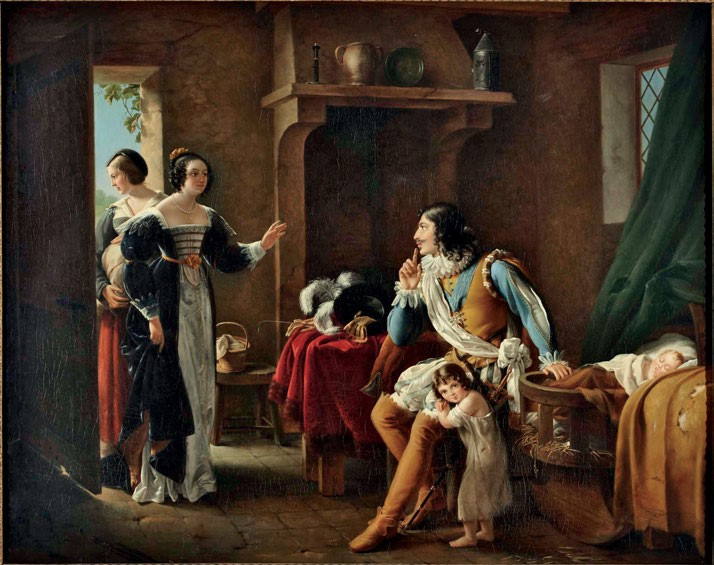
Louis XIII and Madame de La Fayette (1817)

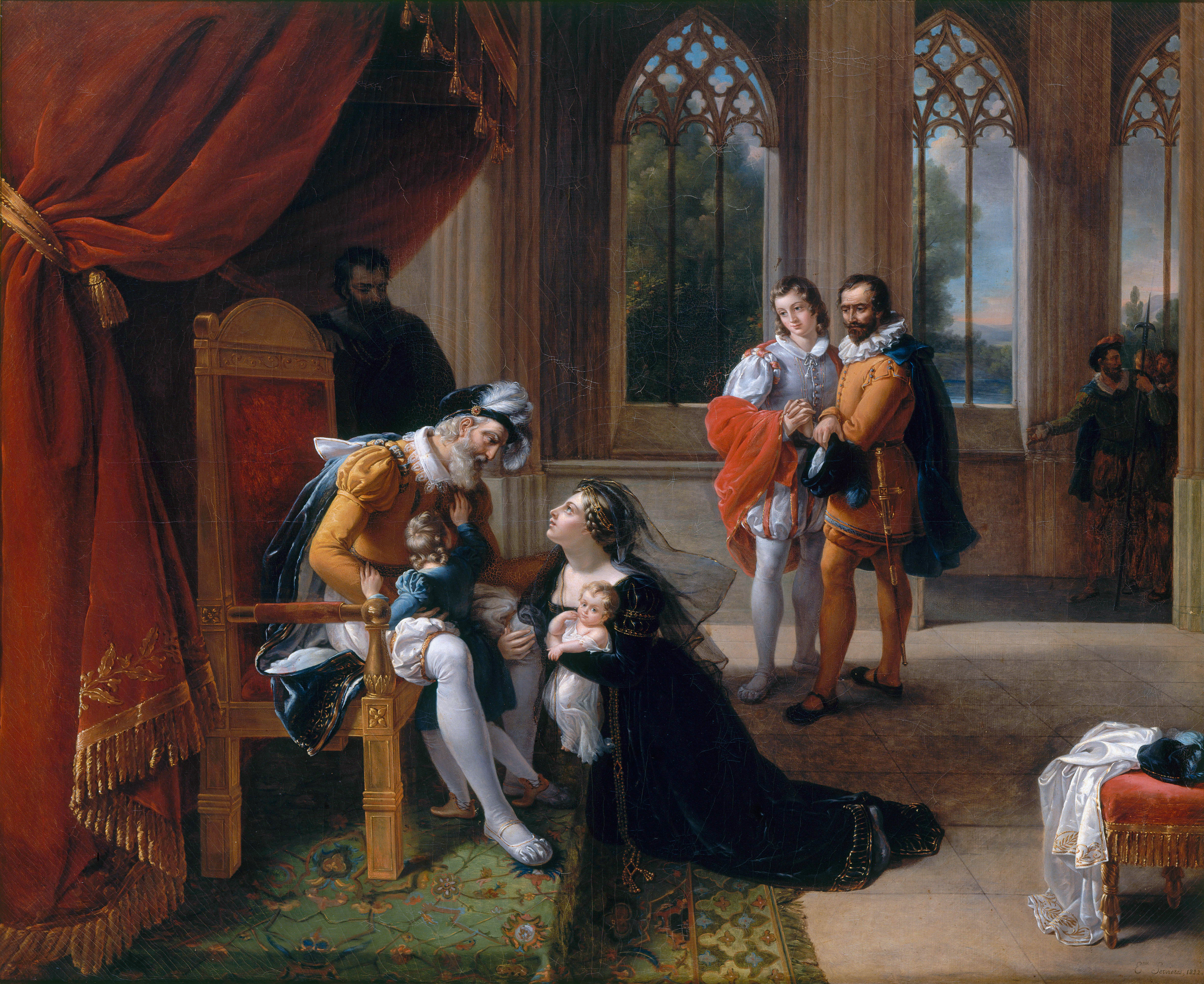
Inez de Castro and her Children at the feet of the King of Portugal (1822)

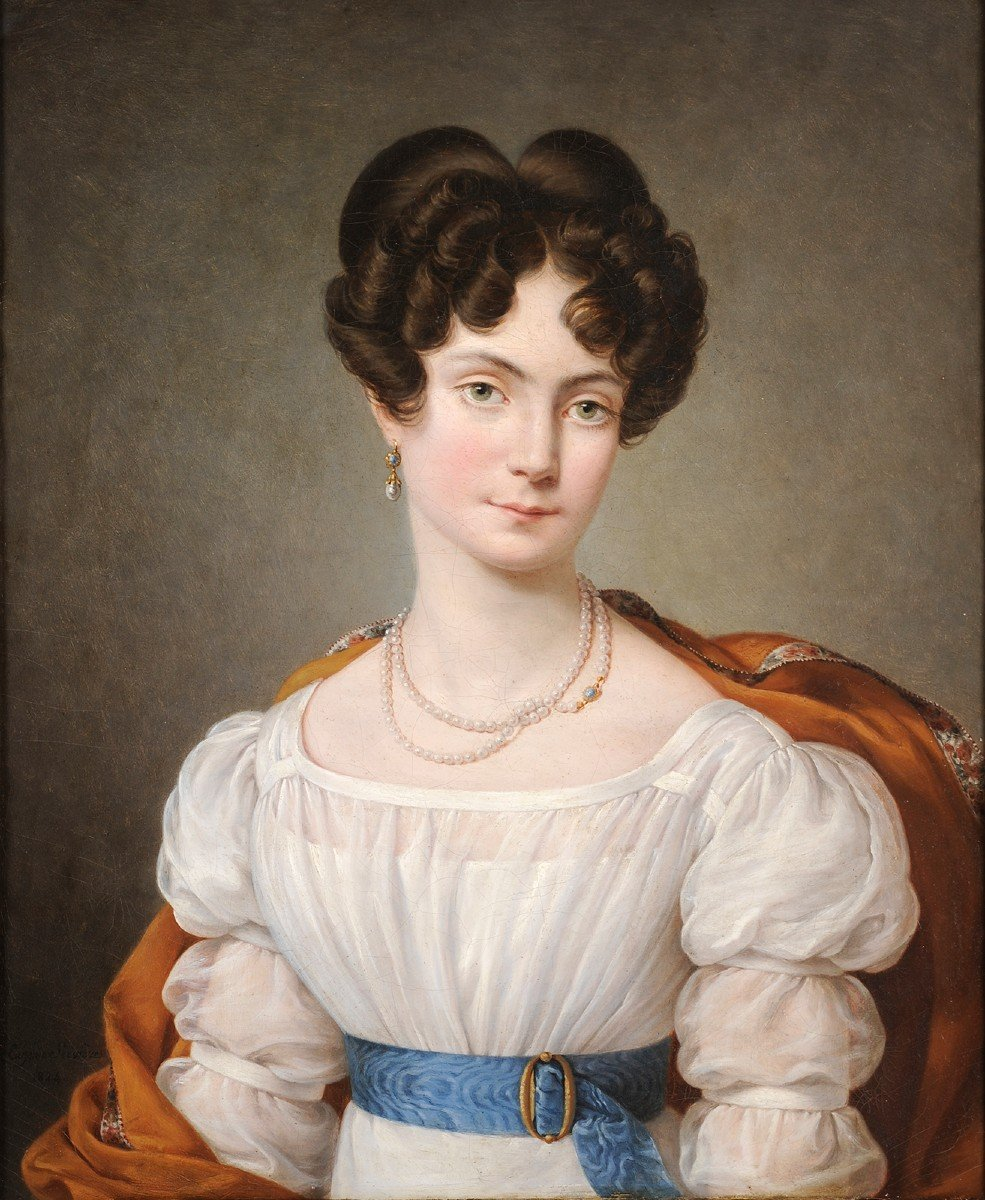
Portrait of a Young Woman (1824)
