= Gabriel de Lurieu =

French author and playwright (1799–1889)

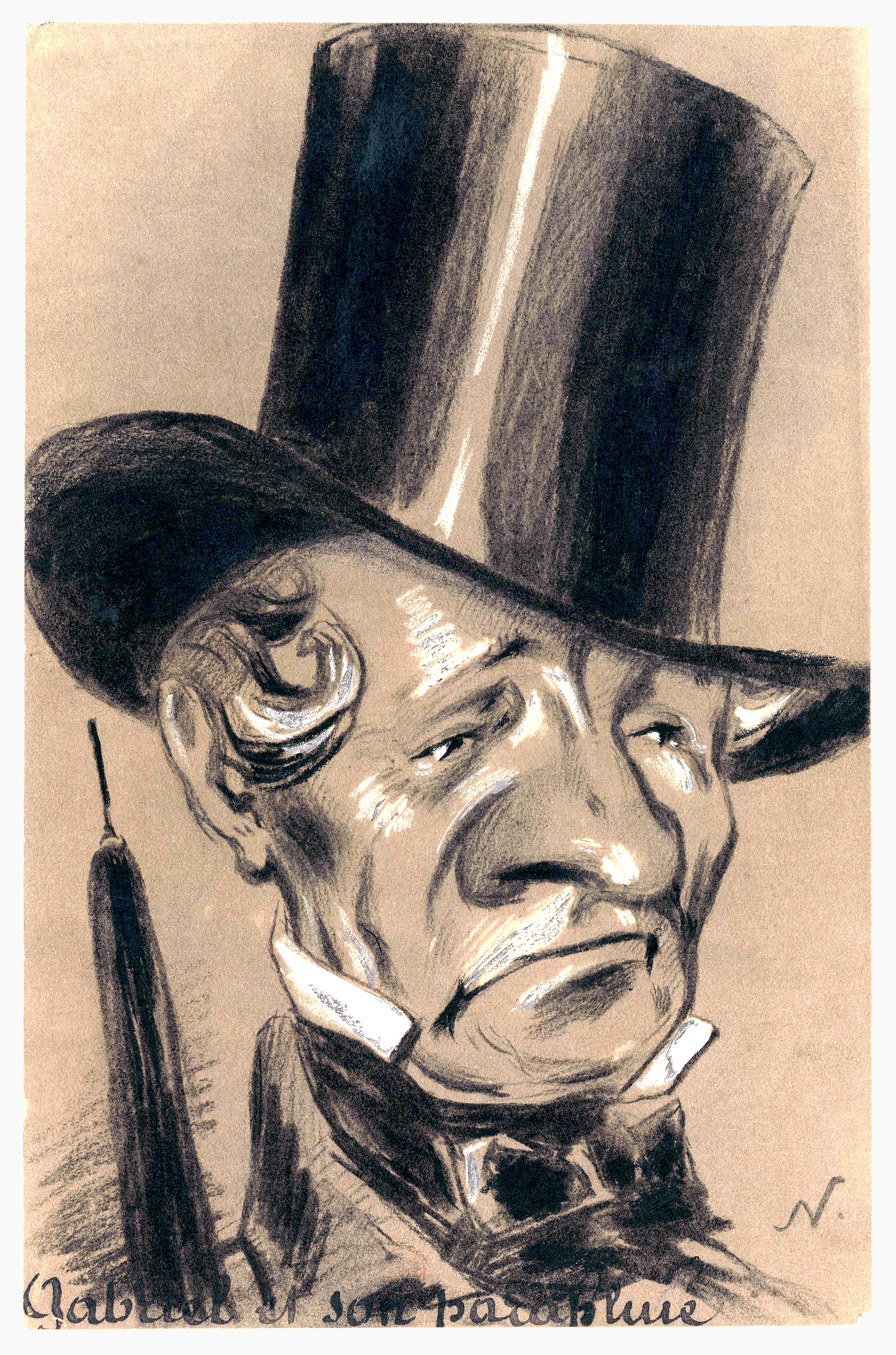
Gabriel et son parapluie, caricature of Gabriel de Lurieu c. 1850 by Nadar

Gabriel de Lurieu (real name Gabriel-Zéphirin Gonyn de Lurieu; Paris, 28 October 1799 (7 brumaire year VIII) – Paris, 5 February 1889) was a French author and playwright.

His brother Jules-Joseph-Gabriel de Lurieu (1792–1869), with whom he is sometimes mistaken, was also a playwright, who used the pseudonym "J. Gabriel", under which he cowrote the libretto for the opera La perle du Brésil by Félicien David, and the collective pseudonym "Monsieur Sapajou" (with Armand d'Artois and Francis d'Allarde).

== Biography ==
The son of a captain of Dragons from a family of the minor nobility (squire) of the former Forez province, parallel to its inspector general career in the watch of Benevolent Institutions of the City of Paris, he started writing theatre plays. He authored numerous plays and libretti for opéras comiques, most of them written in collaboration, in particular with Théophile Marion Dumersan, Francis baron d'Allarde, Armand d'Artois, Nicolas Brazier, Eugène Scribe, Bernard Lopez, Élie Sauvage, Alexis Wafflard, Théodore-Ferdinand Vallou de Villeneuve, Auguste-Michel Benoît Gaudichot Masson, Adolphe Charles Adam and Emmanuel Théaulon.

In 1823, in the 7th arrondissement of Paris, he married his cousin Louise-Charlotte Gonyn de Lurieu, daughter of a former officer became a magistrate.

When he died, the 7 February 1889 issue of le Figaro wrote:

The death has been announced an old playwright, Gabriel de Lurieu. He was 86 years old. While spending much of his career in administration, Lurieu busied himself much with literature. From 1823 to 1858, he composed vaudeville, dramas, comic operas librettos, several of which have been successful. The most famous are Un jour à Rome, the Prise de voile, Un cordon bleu, the Pêche aux beaux-pères, the Loup de mer, Angélique et Médor, the Percherons and the Trois Nicolas.

== Theatre ==
- 1818: Les Solliciteurs et les fous, comedy in 1 act with Mélesville, Théâtre de la Porte-Saint-Martin.
- 1822: Les Blouses ou La Soirée à la mode, comédie en vaudevilles in 1 act with Achille d'Artois and Emmanuel Théaulon, Théâtre des Variétés.
- 1823: Le Gascon à trois visages, folie parade with Charles Honoré, 24 December, Théâtre de la Porte-Saint-Martin.
- 1836: La Belle Écaillère, drame vaudeville with Emmanuel Théaulon, 27 September, Théâtre de la Gaîté.
- 1837: Crouton, chef d'école ou Le Peintre véritablement artiste, tableau in 1 act mingled with couplets, with Emmanuel Théaulon and Frédéric de Courcy, 11 April, Théâtre des Variétés.
- 1837: La Dot de Cécile, vaudeville in 2 acts with Emmanuel Théaulon and Angel, 30 October, Théâtre du Palais Royal.
- 1839: Argentine with Charles Dupeuty and Michel Delaporte, Théâtre du Palais Royal.
- 1858: Les Trois Nicolas, opéra-comique in 3 acts, in collaboration with Eugène Scribe and Bernard Lopez, music by Louis Clapisson, premiered 16 December in the salle Favart.

In 1815, he published a short piece of vaudeville, played in October 1814 at the Théâtre du Vaudeville in Paris, entitled Le Tambour et la Vivandière. The book is available at the library of the University of Michigan.

== Distinctions ==
- Chevalier of the Légion d'honneur (15 January 1839 decree).
- Officier of the Légion d'honneur (1 January 1853 decree).
- Commandeur of the Légion d'honneur (7 August 1869 decree).
