= Joseph Aude =

French playwright and poet (1755–1841)

- Born: 10 December 1755; Apt
- Died: 5 October 1841 (aged 85)
- Occupations: Playwright; Poet

Joseph Aude (10 December 1755 – 5 October 1841) was a familiar of Necker and Buffon whose biography he wrote as well as a comédie en vaudeville about his marriage, presented at the Société littéraire et scientifique d'Apt. Aude Joseph is considered an important author of the traveling theater of the early nineteenth, thanks to his Cadet Rousselle.

== Biography ==
He made his literary debut in 1776, with Fête des Muses, an à-propos in verse played at the Château de Versailles before the king and the court. He met Buffon at the Jardin du Roi, where chevalier de Mouchy, of the House of Noailles, a novelist and correspondent of Voltaire, had led him. Having become familiar with him in Paris, he was his guest at Montbard, but was not, contrary to popular belief, his personal secretary.

He stroke a friendship with the marquis Domenico Caracciolo, ambassador of the Kingdom of Naples in France. In 1781, he was appointed viceroy of the Kingdom of the Two Sicilies and took Aude with him. After he was appointed foreign minister in Naples, 1786, Aude returned to France and joined Buffon in Montbard.

Chevalier Aude was honored with a letter from Frederick the Great. He was tied with Dorvigny, creator of the character Jocrisse, and with Brunet, his favorite actor and had the honor of being played by Talma in 1790.

He was said to be a dissipator, prodigal and drunkard because at the end of his life, he assiduously attended cabarets.

== Works ==
- Vie privée du comte de Buffon
- 1793: Toulon reconquis
- 1797: La Mort du général Hoche
- 1809: Jean-Jacques au Paraclet et les Perruques à la mode
- 1810: La Double Intrigue et le Bureau de renseignement
- 1823: Le Veuvage de Manon
- 1800 Madame Angot au sérail de Constantinople, premiered at the ancient Théâtre Oudinot, on 21 May 1800.
- La France et l'Italie au pied des Alpes : prologue en vers avec quelques notes historiques
- Bedéno, ou le Sancho de Bisnagar : mélodrame en 3 actes en prose
- Héloïse anglaise, drame en vers joué pour la première fois en 1778, et ensuite, en 1787, au théâtre Italien.
- La Ruse d'un jaloux, ou la Double intrigue : Comédie en 1 acte en vers
- La Paix : vaudeville impromptu
- Les Petits ricochets : imitation en 1 acte et en vaudevilles
- Monval et Sophie : drame en 3 actes et en vers
- Matapan, ou les Assassinats de l'amour : tragédie en un acte
- Collin d'Harleville aux Champs-Élysées : comédie-vaudeville en 1 acte
- Diderot, ou le Voyage à Versailles : comédie en 1 acte, en prose
- Arlequin sourd-muet, ou Cassandre opérateur : arlequinade en vaudeville
- Le Message aux Champs-Élysées, ou la Fête des arts et de l'amitié : pièce épisodique en 1 acte en vers
- Léon de Norveld, ou le Prisonnier de Stockholm : pièce historique en 3 actes et à spectacle
- La Veille d'une grande fête : hommage en 1 acte et en vers, mêlés de couplets
- Les Deux colons : trait anecdotique en 1 acte mêlé de couplets
- Le Café d'une petite ville : comédie en 1 acte et en vers, à l'occasion de la paix
- Le Nouveau Ricco, ou la Malle perdue : comédie en 2 actes
- Le Béverley d'Angoulême : comédie en 1 acte
- La Nuit d'un joueur, ou le Petit Béverley : Comédie en 1 acte
- Lettre d'un vieillard de Ferney à l'Académie française : éloge de Voltaire
- La Critique de Madame Angot au sérail : pièce en 1 acte et en vers
- Mercure à Paris : arlequinade en 1 acte
- Corneille au Capitole : scènes héroïques à l'occasion du rétablissement de Sa Majesté Marie-Louise, Impératrice et Reine, après la naissance du Roi de Rome
- Canardin, ou les amours du quai de la volaille : comédie du gros genre, en deux actes, en prose, mêlée de chants et de danses, avec un divertissement.

=== The Cadet Roussel series ===
- Cadet-Roussel, barbier à la Fontaine des Innocents : Folie en 1 acte
- Cadet-Roussel, ou le Café des aveugles : pièce en 2 actes qui n'en font qu'un, en vers et en prose. The play premiered at the Théâtre de la Cité on 12 February 1793.
- L'École tragique, ou Cadet-Roussel maître de déclamation : comédie ou non, en 1 acte (in another version: Cadet-Roussel, professeur ... )
- Cadet-Roussel au jardin turc : facétie en 1 acte
- Cadet-Roussel aux Champs-Élysées, ou la Colère d'Agamemnon : vaudeville en 1 acte

He is however not the only author to have used "Cadet Roussel" as a character. Indeed, the CESAR database reports many Cadet Roussel, from the Cadet Roussel garçon d'auberge, by Prévost (Théâtre des Associés, 1784) to the École tragique ou Cadet Roussel maître de déclamation, by Aude (Théâtre de Montansier, Paris, August 1799) for the 18th century, then others during the 19th century such as Victor Hugo who, in his Ninety-Three, featured Danton ridiculing Robespierre who had just monopolized the floor for two hours at the National Convention:

Cadet Rousselle fait des discours (Cadet Roussel delivers speeches)
Qui ne sont pas longs quand ils sont courts. (which are not long when they are shorts)

== Bibliography ==
The life of Joseph Aude was written in 1871 by Alexis Dureau, librarian at the Académie de médecine, under the title: Notice sur Joseph Aude, chevalier de Malte, poète, auteur dramatique, dit le secrétaire de Buffon, présentée à la Société littéraire et scientifique d'Apt, aux imprimeries de J.-S. Jean.
