= Sewrin =

French playwright and goguettier (1771–1853)

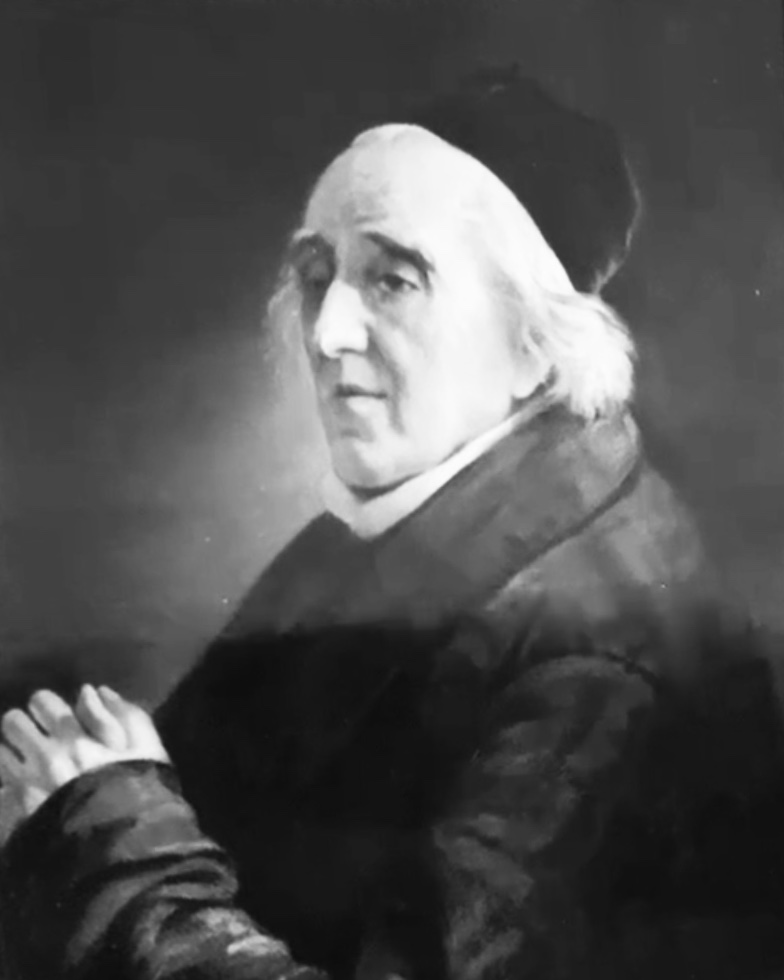
- Charles-Augustin Bassompierre-Sewrin (1771–1853)
- Born: Charles-Augustin Bassompierre; 9 October 1771
- Died: 24 April 1853 (aged 81); Paris, France
- Occupations: Playwright, librettist, goguetier
- Spouse: Louise-Julie des Acres de l'Aigle (1787–1845)

Sewrin, real name Charles-Augustin Bassompierre, (9 October 1771 – 22 April 1853) was a French playwright and goguettier. In addition to his writing of comedies, opéras-comiques, vaudevilles and songs, he also was a librettist for François Adrien Boieldieu, Ferdinand Hérold and Luigi Cherubini.

== Biography ==
Charles-Augustin Bassompierre was born 9 October 1771 in Metz, a French fortress in the Three Bishoprics. Soon after the Révolution, the young Charles-Augustin moved to Paris. In 1802, he was one of the eleven singers individually named, with three musicians, as members of the goguette Les Déjeuners des garçons de bonne humeur. A prolific author, from 1793 to 1825, he wrote libretto for operas comiques, vaudevilles, comedies and impromptus, alone or in collaboration with René de Chazet and Dumersan, as well as poems and novels. Appointed archivist secretary at Les Invalides under the Bourbon Restauration regime, he lost his position in 1830 with the fall of Charles X.

Charles-Augustin Bassompierre died in Paris on 22 April 1853 and was buried in the Montparnasse cemetery.

A knight of the ordre de la Légion d'honneur, he was married to Louise-Julie des Acres de l'Aigle (1787–1845).

== Works ==
=== Operas ===
- L'École de village, opéra-comique in 1 act, music by Jean-Pierre Solié, created at the Opéra-Comique (salle Favart) 10 May 1793
- La Moisson, opéra-comique in 2 acts, music by Jean-Pierre Solié, created at the Opéra-Comique (salle Favart) 5 September 1793
- Le Plaisir et la Gloire, opéra-comique in 1 act, music by Jean-Pierre Solié, created at the Opéra-Comique (salle Favart) 30 nivôse an II (19 January 1794)
- La Chasse aux loups, opéra-comique in 1 act, created at the Théâtre de la Cité-Variétés 6 floréal an V (25 April 1797)
- Le Maçon, opéra-comique in 1 act, music by Louis-Sébastien Lebrun, created at the Théâtre Feydeau 14 frimaire an VIII (5 December 1799)
- Le Locataire, opera en 1 act, music by Pierre Gaveaux, created at the Opéra-Comique (salle Favart) 6 July 1800
- François Ier ou la Fête mystérieuse, comédie lyrique in 3 acts, cowritten with René de Chazet, music by Rodolphe Kreutzer, created at the Opéra-Comique (Théâtre Feydeau) 14 March 1807
- L'Opéra au village, opéra-comique in 1 act, music by Jean-Pierre Solié, created at the Opéra-Comique (Théâtre Feydeau) 30 July 1807
- Jadis et aujourd'hui, opéra-comique in 1 act, music by Rodolphe Kreutzer, created at the Opéra-Comique (Théâtre Feydeau) 3 October 1808
- Le Crescendo, opéra-comique in 1 act, music by Luigi Cherubini, created at the Opéra-Comique (Théâtre Feydeau) 1 September 1810
- Le Forgeron de Bassora, opéra-comique in 2 acts, music by Frédéric Kreubé, created at the Opéra-Comique (Théâtre Feydeau) 14 October 1813
- L'Héritier de Paimpol, opéra-comique in 3 acts, music by Nicolas-Charles Bochsa, created at the Opéra-Comique (Théâtre Feydeau) 29 December 1813
- La Fête du village voisin, opéra-comique in 3 acts, music by François-Adrien Boieldieu, created at the Opéra-Comique (Théâtre Feydeau) 5 March 1816
- Valentin, opéra-comique in 2 acts, music by Henri Montan Berton, created at the Opéra-Comique (Théâtre Feydeau) 10 December 1819
- Le Roi René ou la Provence au quinzième siècle, opéra-comique in 2 acts cowritten with Gabriel-Alexandre Belle, music by Ferdinand Hérold, created at the Opéra-Comique (salle Favart) 24 August 1824

=== Theatre ===
- Julia ou les Souterrains du château de Mazzini, melodrama in 3 acts and in prose, created at the Théâtre des Jeunes-Artistes in frimaire an VII (December 1798)
- Les Mariniers de Saint-Cloud, impromptu, created at the Opéra-Comique (salle Favart), 22 brumaire an VIII (13 November 1799)
- La Leçon conjugale, comedy in 3 acts cowritten with René de Chazet, created 5 November 1804
- La Laitière de Bercy, vaudeville in 2 acts cowritten with René de Chazet, created at the Théâtre du Vaudeville 23 February 1805
- Lundi, mardi et mercredi, vaudeville in 3 acts cowritten with René de Chazet, created at the théâtre des Variétés 16 June 1806
- Les Petites Marionnettes ou la Loterie, vaudeville in 1 act cowritten with René de Chazet, created at the Théâtre du Palais-Royal 27 September 1806
- La Famille des innocents ou Comme l'amour vient, one-act comedy mingled with vaudevilles cowritten with René de Chazet, created at the Théâtre du Palais-Royal 26 January 1807
- La Famille des lurons, vaudeville in 1 act cowritten with René de Chazet, created at the Théâtre du Vaudeville 13 July 1807
- Pauvre Jacques, comedy in 3 acts and in prose mingled with vaudevilles cowritten with René de Chazet, created at the Théâtre du Vaudeville 31 October 1807
- Romainville ou la Promenade du dimanche, vaudeville in 1 act cowritten with René de Chazet, created at the Théâtre des Variétés 30 November 1807
- Anna ou les Deux Chaumières, comedy in 1 act and in prose mingled with songs, created at the Opéra-Comique (Théâtre Feydeau) 20 February 1808
- Ordre et Désordre, three-act comedy cowritten with René de Chazet, created 26 March 1808
- Les Acteurs à l'épreuve, vaudeville épisodique in 1 act cowritten with René de Chazet, created at the Théâtre des Variétés 7 June 1808
- Lagrange-Chancel, one-act vaudeville cowritten with René de Chazet, created at the Théâtre des Variétés 22 November 1808
- Coco Pépin, vaudeville in 1 act cowritten with René de Chazet, created at the Théâtre des Variétés 29 December 1809
- Une soirée de carnaval, vaudeville in 1 act, created at the Théâtre des Variétés 12 February 1810 for the Carnaval de Paris
- Le Petit Pêcheur, vaudeville in 1 act cowritten with Dumersan, created at the Théâtre des Variétés 8 August 1810
- Grivois la malice, vaudeville in 1 act created at the Théâtre des Variétés 14 August 1810
- La Fiancée du pays de Caux ou les Normands vengés, comedy in 1 act, created at the Théâtre des Variétés 23 January 1811
- Les Habitants des Landes, vaudeville in 1 act created at the Théâtre des Variétés 21 October 1811
- L'Homme sans façon ou les Contrariétés, opéra-comique in 3 acts, music by Rodolphe Kreutzer, created at the Opéra-Comique (Théâtre Feydeau) 7 January 1812
- Jocrisse corrigé ou la Journée aux accidents, one-act comedy, created at the Théâtre des Variétés 21 September 1812
- Les Intrigues de la Rapée, vaudeville in 1 act cowritten with Dumersan et Merle, created at the Théâtre des Variétés in 1813
- Les Deux Magots de la Chine, vaudeville in 1 act, created at the Théâtre des Variétés 12 January 1813
- La Vivandière, vaudeville in 1 act, created at the Théâtre des Variétés 23 April 1813
- Les Anglaises pour rire, ou la Table et le Logement, comedy in 1 act cowritten with Dumersan, created at the Théâtre des Variétés 26 December 1814
- Les Amours du port au blé, comédie grivoise in 1 act, cowritten with Dumersan, created at the Théâtre des Variétés 14 June 1820
- Maître Blaise, vaudeville in 2 acts cowritten with Maurice Ourry, created at the Théâtre du Vaudeville 27 November 1820
- La Femme du sous-préfet, vaudeville in 1 act cowritten with Moreau created at the Théâtre du Gymnase-Dramatique 18 January 1821
- Le Comédien d’Étampes, vaudeville in 1 act cowritten with Moreau created at the Théâtre du Gymnase-Dramatique 23 January 1821
- Pierre, Paul et Jean, vaudeville in 2 acts cowritten with Maurice Ourry, created at the Théâtre du Vaudeville 3 November 1821
- La Leçon de danse et d'équitation, vaudeville in 1 act cowritten with Nicolas Gersin, created at the Théâtre des Variétés 13 December 1821
- Kabri le sabotier, vaudeville in 1 act, created at the Théâtre de la Porte-Saint-Martin 23 January 1822
- Le Garde-moulin, vaudeville cowritten with Moreau, created at the Théâtre du Gymnase-Dramatique 28 January 1822
- Rataplan ou le Petit Tambour, vaudeville in 1 act cowritten with Augustin Vizentini, created at the Théâtre du Vaudeville 25 February 1822
- Amélie ou le Chapitre des contrariétés, comédie-vaudeville in 2 acts, created at the Théâtre du Vaudeville 2 July 1822
- Les Mauvaises Têtes, vaudeville in 1 act cowritten with Maurice Ourry, created at the Théâtre du Vaudeville 6 January 1823
- Nicolas Rémi, vaudeville in 2 acts, created at the Théâtre du Vaudeville 24 May 1823
- Les Femmes de chambre, vaudeville in 1 act, created at the Théâtre du Vaudeville 21 June 1823
- L'Atelier de peinture, tableau-vaudeville in 1 act cowritten with Léonard Tousez, created at the Théâtre du Gymnase-Dramatique 31 October 1823
- Catherine, vaudeville in 1 act cowritten with Dumersan, created at the Théâtre des Variétés 28 October 1824
- La Chambre de Suzon, one-act comedy mingled with couplets, cowritten with Carmouche and Dumersan, created at the Théâtre des Variétés 15 December 1825
- Les Amours du port au blé (2nd version), comédie-vaudeville in 1 act, cowritten with Dumersan, created at the Théâtre du Palais-Royal 28 October 1831
- undated: Le Lithographe, vaudeville in 1 act cowritten with Léonard Tousez
- undated: Le Chevalier d'honneur, vaudeville in 1 act cowritten with Léonard Tousez and Nicolas Gersin
- undated: Riquet à la houppe, vaudeville-féerie in 1 act and 3 tableaux cowritten with Nicolas Brazier

=== Literature ===
- La Famille des menteurs, « ouvrage véridique », Masson, Paris, 1802 (Read online)
- Histoire d'un chien, écrite par lui-même et publiée par un homme de ses amis, « ouvrage critique, moral et philosophique », Masson, Paris, 1802 (Read online)
- Histoire d'une chatte, écrite par elle-même et publiée par un homme de ses amis, Masson, Paris, 1802.
- Brick-Bolding
- La Première Nuit de mes noces

Source : Gallica

== Bibliography ==
Jacques Isnardon, Le Théâtre de la Monnaie depuis sa fondation jusqu'à nos jours, Schott frères, Bruxelles, 1890 (Read online)
