= Théophile Marion Dumersan =

French writer and numismatist (1780–1849)

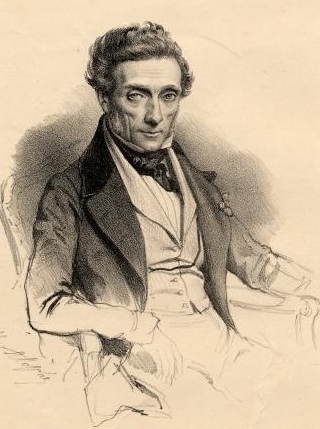
Théophile Marion Dumersan

Théophile Marion Dumersan (4 January 1780, Plou, Cher – 13 April 1849, Paris) was a French writer of plays, vaudevilles, poetry, novels, chanson collections, librettos, and novels, as well as a numismatist and curator attached to the Cabinet des médailles et antiques of the Bibliothèque royale.

== Life ==
The family's real surname was Marion but – to distinguish himself from his brothers – Théophile's brother altered his surname to "du Mersan", after the name of one of its lands. The young Théophile had already found a taste for the theatre by 1795 by learning to read Racine and Molière. In that year, aged 16, whilst his family was distressed by the Reign of Terror, Théophile found work under Aubin-Louis Millin de Grandmaison, curator of the Cabinet des médailles et antiques de la Bibliothèque royale. With his colleague Théodore-Edme Mionnet, future member of the Académie des inscriptions et belles-lettres, he perfected a new system for classifying medals into geographical and chronological order, and protected the collection from dispersal by the allies after Napoleon's defeat. He then published at his own expense a history of the collection and description, as newly rearranged according to historical principles, in 1838 All this led to his being named curator of the Cabinet in 1842.

At the age of 18, he put on his first play, titled Arlequin perruquier, ou Les Têtes à la Titus, a critique of the fashions and mores of the day, and soon began supplying the théâtres de boulevard. In two years, he wrote no less than 18 plays, including L'Ange et le diable in 1799 (a 5-act drama which was produced more than 5 times, a remarkable number for that era). In total, he produced 238 pieces, more than 50 of which he wrote without a collaborator. The others were the result of a collaboration with better Parisian vaudevillistes, including Jean-Nicolas Bouilly, Nicolas Brazier, Pierre-Frédéric-Adolphe Carmouche, Marc-Antoine Désaugiers, Mélesville and Eugène Scribe. His greatest success was Les Saltimbanques, written with Charles Varin, a "farce désopilante" according to the Grand Dictionnaire universel du XIXe siècle, put on at the Théâtre des Variétés in 1838.

Amidst all these productions, Dumersan also found time to write works on numismatics and the history of the theatre, including the Manuel des coulisses, a lexicon of theatrical expressions and actors' slang. Towards the end of his life, he published several collections of chansons, notably the Chansons nationales et populaires de France, published in two volumes in 1866.

== Selected works ==
Théâtre

- Le Nécessaire et le superflu, comédie-vaudeville in 1 act, with Armand d'Artois, Paris, Théâtre du Vaudeville, 10 July 1813 Online text
- Les Cochers, tableau grivois, mêlé de vaudevilles, in 1 act, with Gabriel de Lurieu and Nicolas Brazier, Paris, Théâtre du Vaudeville, 10 October 1825 Online text
- La Chambre de Suzon, comédie in 1 act, mix of couplets, with Pierre-Frédéric-Adolphe Carmouche and Charles-Augustin de Bassompierre Sewrin, Paris, Théâtre des Variétés, 15 December 1825 Online text
- Les Paysans, ou L'Ambition au village, comédie in 1 act, mix of couplets, with Nicolas Brazier and Mélesville, Paris, Théâtre des Variétés, 28 February 1826 Online text
- L'Auvergnate, ou La Principale Locataire, vaudeville in 1 act, with Nicolas Brazier and Gabriel de Lurieu, Paris, Théâtre du Vaudeville, 26 April 1826 Online text
- Les Écoliers en promenade, comédie-vaudeville in 1 act, with Nicolas Brazier and Gabriel de Lurieu, Paris, Théâtre des Variétés, 5 July 1826 Online text
- Les Petites Biographies, comédie-vaudeville in 1 act, with Nicolas Brazier and Gabriel de Lurieu, Paris, Théâtre des Variétés, 29 August 1826 Online text
- Les Passages et les rues, ou La Guerre déclarée, vaudeville in 1 act, with Nicolas Brazier and Gabriel de Lurieu, Paris, Théâtre des Variétés, 7 March 1827 Online text
- Les Saltimbanques, comédie-parade in 3 acts, mixed-couplets, with Charles Voirin, Paris, Théâtre des Variétés, 23 January 1838 Online text

Chansons

- Chants et chansons populaires de la France (3 volumes, 1843–1844)
- Chansons et rondes enfantines, recueillies et accompagnées de contes, notices, historiettes et dialogues, par Du Mersan, enrichies de la musique en regard par Gustave Jeane-Julien (1846)
- Chansons sentimentales et romances d'amour, avec notices historiques et littéraires (1846)
- Chansons bachiques, grivoises et épicuriennes, avec notices historiques et littéraires (1846)
- Chansons nationales et républicaines, de 1789 à 1848, avec des notices historiques (1848)
- Chansons nationales et populaires de France, accompagnées de notes historiques et littéraires, avec Noël Ségur (2 volumes, 1866) Online text 1 2

Numismatique

- Notice des monuments exposés dans le Cabinet des médailles et antiques de la Bibliothèque du roi, suivie d'une description des objets les plus curieux que renferme cet établissement, de notes historiques sur fondation, ses accroissements et d'un catalogue d'empreintes de pierres gravées (1819)
- Description des médailles antiques du cabinet de feu M. Allier de Hauteroche (1829)
- Éléments de numismatique, ou Introduction à la connaissance des médailles antiques, suivis de quelques détails sur la manière de supputer les monnaies anciennes et sur leur valeur (1833)
- Histoire du cabinet des médailles, antiques et pierres gravées, avec une notice sur la Bibliothèque royale, et une description des objets exposés dans cet établissement (1838)

Other

- Poésies diverses (1822)
- Le Soldat laboureur, philosophical novel (3 volumes, 1822)
- L'Homme à deux têtes, histoire de Fernand-Carlos de Vargas, novel (2 volumes, 1825)
- Manuel des coulisses, ou Guide de l'amateur (1826)
- Histoire du théâtre de l'Odéon (1841)
- Mémoires de Mlle Flore [Corvée], artiste du théâtre des Variétés (collaboration, 3 volumes, 1845)

=== Popular French chansons ===
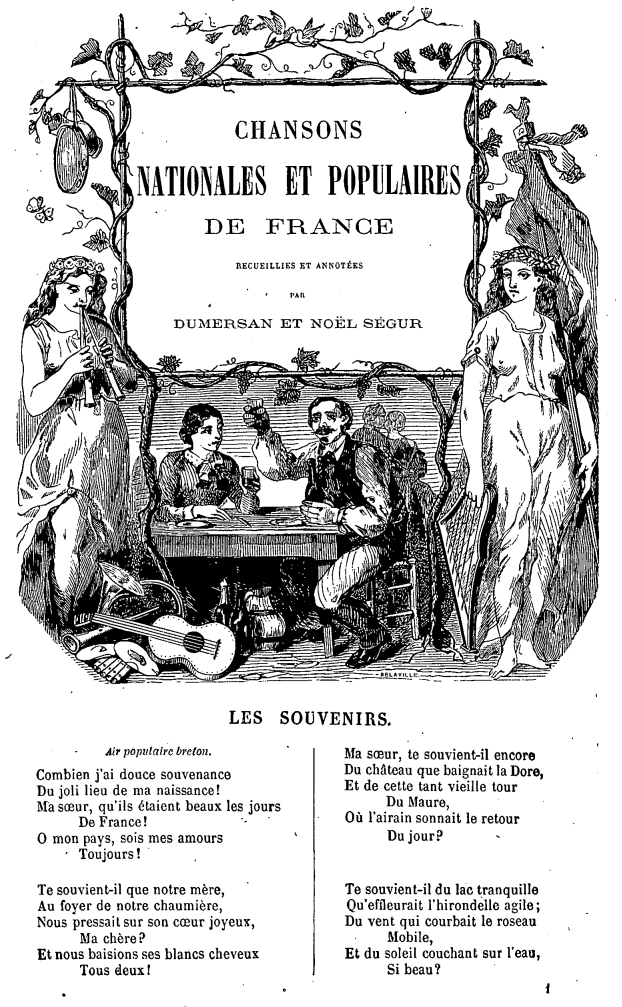
Frontispice

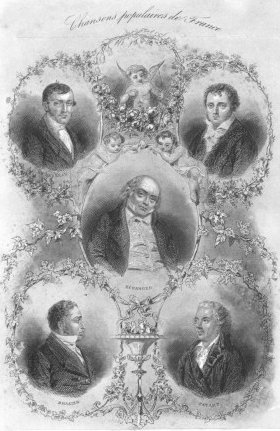
The chansonniers (1)
Centre : Béranger.
Top left : Dumersan.
Bottom left : Brazier.
Bottom right : Favart.

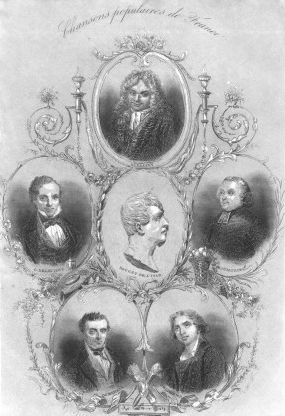
The chansonniers (2)
Centre : Rouget de Lisle.
Left : Delavigne.

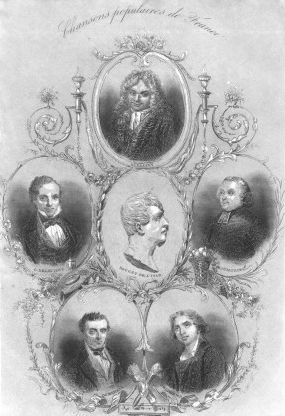
The chansonniers (3)
Top : Désaugiers.
