= Henri Dupin =

French librettist and dramatist

- Born: Jean-Henri Dupin; 1 September 1791; Paris
- Died: 5 April 1887 (aged 95); Paris
- Occupations: Librettist, dramatist

Jean-Henri Dupin (1 September 1791 – 5 April 1887) was a French librettist and dramatist. He authored more than 200 pieces, of which fifty were written in collaboration with Eugène Scribe.

== Works ==
- Les Deux Hommes du Nord
- Le Fils d'un agent de change
- Le Fou de Péronne
- La Mansarde des artistes
- Les Manteaux
- Michel et Christine
- Napoléon à Berlin
- La Pension bourgeoise
- Les Six pantoufles, ou Le Rendez-vous des Cendrillons
- Le Solliciteur, ou L'Art d'obtenir des places
- La Villageoise somnambule, ou Les Deux fiancés
