= Nicolas Brazier =

French chansonnier and vaudevillist (1783–1838)

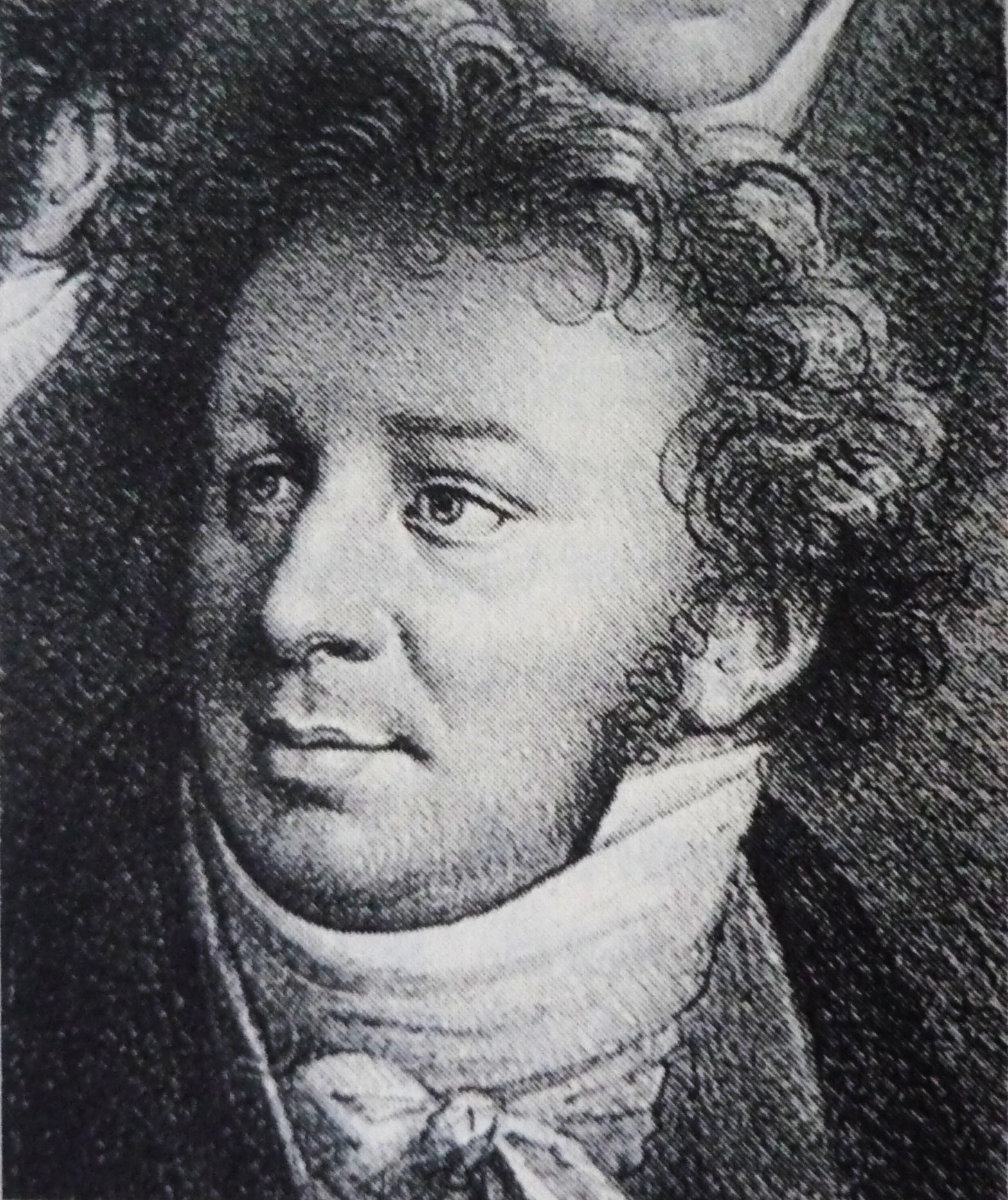
Nicolas Brazier

Nicolas Brazier (17 February 1783, Paris – 18 February 1838) was a French chansonnier and vaudevillist.

== Life ==
Although his father was a boarding school master and the author of multiple school manuals, Brazier's education was however strongly neglected due to the French Revolution. At first a jeweller's apprentice, then employed in the "Droits réunis" (the French indirect taxes administration of the time), he showed a talent for verse and was encouraged and guided by Armand Gouffé. Following his first success at the Théâtre des Délassements-Comiques, in 1803, he left his job to devote himself to chansons and to the theatre, following courses at school to fill in the gaps in his education.

His witty, spirited and lively chansons often proved popular, though the vulgarity of his style has led to them being forgotten. The Société du Caveau keeps their memory alive.

Brazier collaborated on over 200 witty vaudeville pieces, above all on the couplets. His collaborators included Dumersan, Désaugiers, Merle, Mélesville, Théaulon, Carmouche, etc. The best known of his pieces are : le Soldat laboureur; les Cuisinières; les Bonnes d’enfants; le Ci-devant jeune homme; Le Coin de rue; Les Cuisinières; Préville et Taconnet; la Carte à payer; La Laitière de Montfermeil; le Savetier et le Financier; Je fais mes farces; le Philtre champenois; etc.

Brazier also wrote a Histoire des petits théâtres de Paris (Paris, 1838, 2 vol. in-8), a light, amusing, useful and curious chronicle, despite its errors. Besides a chanson collection in honour of the Bourbons, under the title Souvenirs de dix ans (Paris, 1824), two editions of his other couplets survive (Paris, 1835, 1836). He wrote, in the Vert-Vert, a series of articles on les Abbés chansonniers, etc.

== Sources ==
- Gustave Vapereau, Dictionnaire universel des littératures, Paris, Hachette, 1876, p. 322
