= Emmanuel Théaulon =

French playwright (1787–1841)

Marie-Emmanuel-Guillaume-Marguerite Théaulon de Lambert (14 August 1787, Aigues-Mortes – 16 November 1841) was a French playwright.

A customs inspector, then an inspector of military hospitals, he composed an Ode on the birth of the King of Rome which brought him thanks from Napoleon himself. In 1814 he sang for the Bourbons and put on his first play, Les Clefs de Paris, ou le Dessert d’Henri IV (The Keys of Paris, or the Deservings of Henry IV), in their honour.

In 1815, he composed and organised the posting of proclamations in honour of Louis XVIII. He collaborated on the royalist journals Le Nain rose, La Foudre, L’Apollon.

== Selected works ==
Above all during the Bourbon restoration, he wrote and put on a large number (sometimes alone, sometimes with collaborators), 250 according to one account. Written extremely quickly, most of them are only sketches, whose style often leaves something to be desired but which do not lack wit and beauty. He wrote two five-act verse comedies, L’Artiste ambitieux (1820) and L’Indiscret ( 1825), both put on at the Odéon, which sometimes rise to comic truth.

His other pieces include: Les fiancés (1809); Stanislas en voyage (1812); La clochette, opéra comique (1817); Le petit chaperon rouge, opéra comique (1818); Paris à Pékin (1817); Le mariage à la hussarde (1819); Le grenadier de Fanchon (1824); Le bénéficiaire, with Étienne (1825); La mère au bal et la fille a la maison (1826); M. Jovial, with Choquart (1827); Le père de la débutante, with Bayard, etc.

== Sources ==
- Gustave Vapereau, Dictionnaire universel des littératures, Paris, Hachette, 1876, p. 1959
