= Théâtre du Vaudeville =

Theatre in Paris

Coordinates: 48°52′16.5″N 2°20′1″E

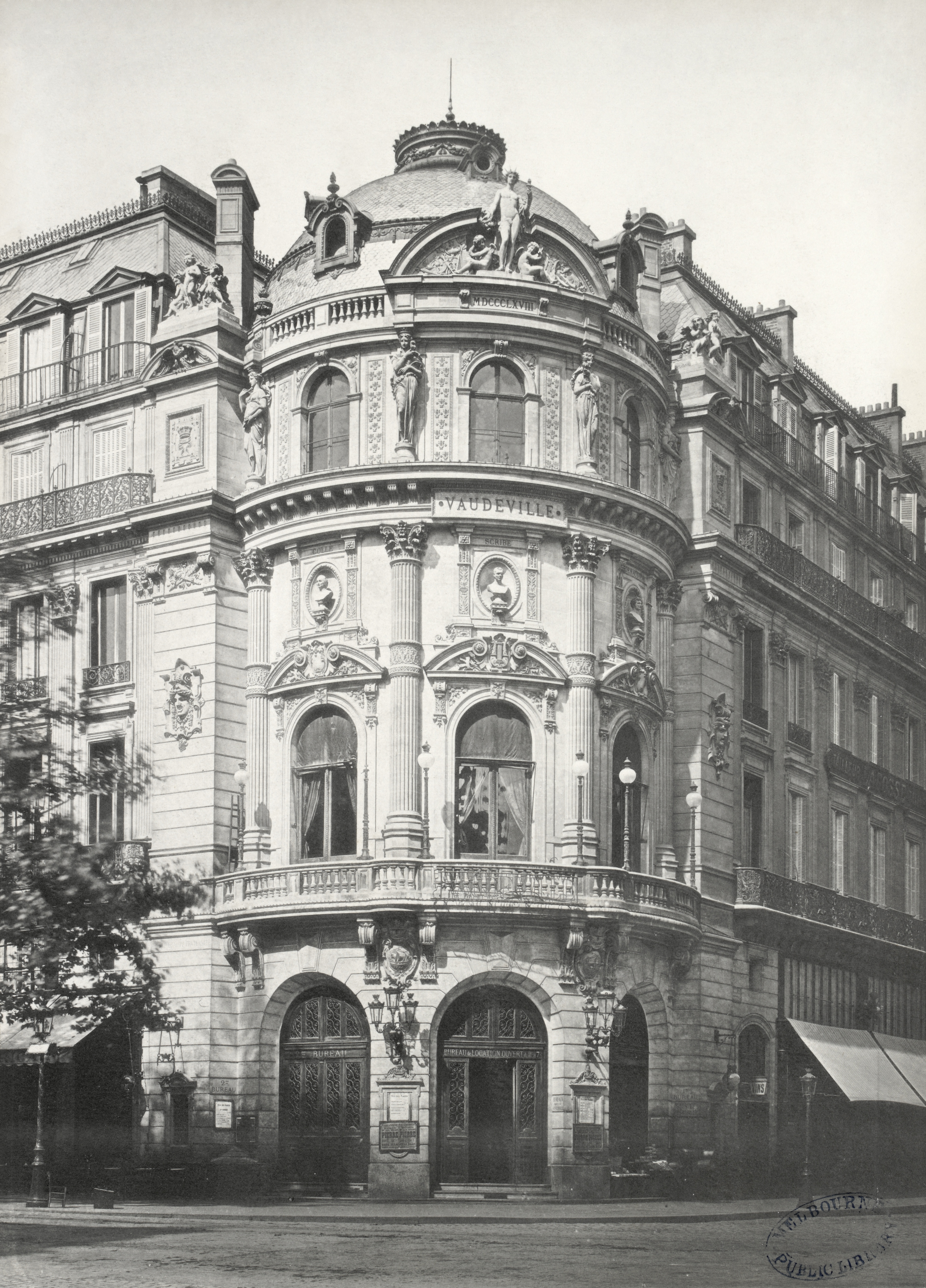
The Théâtre du Vaudeville on the Boulevard des Capucines, ca. 1870, photo by Charles Marville

The Théâtre du Vaudeville (French pronunciation: [teɑtʁ dy vodvil]) was a theatre company in Paris. It opened on 12 January 1792 on rue de Chartres. Its directors, Piis and Barré, mainly put on "petites pièces mêlées de couplets sur des airs connus", including vaudevilles.

After the theatre on the rue de Chartres burned down in 1838, the Vaudeville temporarily based itself on boulevard de Bonne-Nouvelle before in 1841 setting up in the Salle de la Bourse on the Place de la Bourse in the 2e arrondissement. This building was demolished in 1869. Eugène Labiche and Henri Meilhac put on several of their works there, and it also hosted Jules Verne's play Onze jours de siège (1861). Other writers whose works were put on there were Edmond Gondinet, Alexandre Bisson, Théophile Marion Dumersan, Jean-François Bayard, Narcisse Fournier and Gaston Arman de Caillavet.

In 1852, La Dame aux camélias by Alexandre Dumas fils was put on here. For the first time in the era, there were over 100 consecutive performances. Verdi was in the audience at this theatre and wrote La Traviata (1853) based on the play.

From 1866 to 1868, a new Théâtre du Vaudeville was built on boulevard des Capucines, at the corner of Rue de la Chaussée-d'Antin, in the 9e arrondissement. Although the Vaudeville continued as a commercial boulevard playhouse, it occasionally leased its stage to new experimentalist plays of the Independent Theatre movement. On 20–21 May 1891, Paul Fort's Théâtre d'Art presented a benefit for Paul Verlaine and Paul Gauguin, consisting of a program of poetry readings and five short plays, including, most notably, the premiere of Maurice Maeterlinck's Symbolist landmark work Intruder.

In 1927, this building was acquired by Paramount and transformed into the cinema it is today, under the name the Paramount Opéra then (from 31 October 2007) the Gaumont Opéra. It has seven auditoria and is served by Opéra on the Paris Metro.
