= Jean-Louis Wagnière =

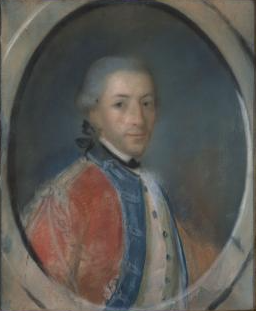
Jean-Louis Wagnière

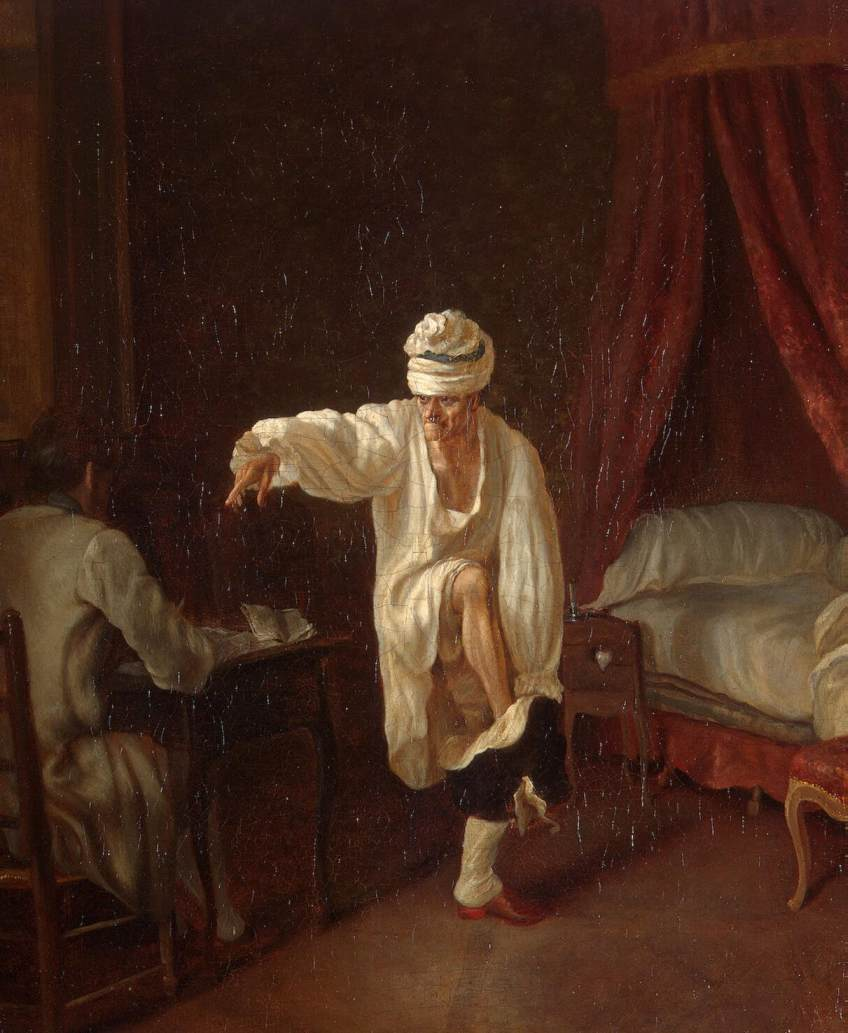
'Voltaire's Morning' by Jean Huber, showing Voltaire dictating to Wagnière while dressing

Jean-Louis Wagnière (15 October 1739, Rueyres, Vaud, Switzerland – 7 April 1802, Ferney-Voltaire) was Voltaire's secretary from 1756 to 1778, when Voltaire died.

== In Voltaire’s service ==
Wagnière entered Voltaire's service as his valet de chambre early in 1755 shortly after he arrived at Prangins near Lake Geneva. He followed him to his house at Les Délices and then to Ferney. He was soon given the job of assisting Voltaire's secretary, Cosimo Alessandro Collini, as he had good handwriting and liked literature. Voltaire taught him Latin. In June 1756 Voltaire abruptly dismissed Collini because he had insulted Madame Denis in a letter. After Collini's departure, Wagnière took over his role.

Wagnière was Voltaire's most loyal secretary, and the only one who was not dismissed. His discretion, his enormous capacity for work, his fine handwriting which was always clear and easy to read and above all his scrupulous honesty are among the reasons for his unusually long service. He worked for twenty-four years for Voltaire, who referred to him as 'faithful Wagnière'.

His role went beyond that normally associated with a secretary. He was also Voltaire's librarian and archivist, administrator of the chateau of Ferney and accountant of the estate, chief of staff and the essential intermediary between the great man and the innumerable visitors who wished to speak to him. He was his master's principal copyist, and most of the manuscripts of Voltaire's work form the last twenty years of his life are in Wagnière's hand. In the 1770s, Voltaire probably dictated more than 90% of his letters to Wagnière.

Wagnière was not with Voltaire at the end of his life. Having spent several months in Paris and realising that he probably could not survive a return journey to Ferney, Voltaire gave him power of attorney and sent him back to Ferney to deal with matters on the estate. After three weeks Madame Denis decided to recall him to be with Voltaire but Voltaire was dead by the time Wagnière returned. The last letter Voltaire wrote was to Wagnière:

'I am dying my dear Wagnière, it seems quite difficult that I can avoid it. I am really punished for your departure, for having left Ferney, and for having taken a house in Paris. I embrace you tenderly, my dear friend, and with sadness.'

== Voltaire's library ==
After Voltaire's death on 30 May 1778, Catherine the Great of Russia commissioned Wagnière to install his library at the Hermitage in Saint Petersburg, which she had acquired from his estate. Wagnière did so, carefully locating the books in the same order as they had followed in Ferney. He also compiled two inventories, one of the manuscripts preserved in the library, and the other of Voltaire's marginal notes in various works.

== His master's legacy ==
After his return from Russia, Wagnière dedicated himself to the memory and the legacy of his master, editing four biographical accounts between 1780 and 1787: 'la Relation du dernier voyage de Voltaire' ('An Account of Voltaire's Last Journey') (1780–1781), les Additions au Commentaire Historique' ('Additions to the Historic Commentary')(1781), 'l’Examen des Mémoires secrets dits de Bachaumont' ('An Examination of the Secret Memoirs said to be by Bachaumont') (1783), and 'l’Examen des Mémoires pour servir à l’histoire de M. de Voltaire' ('An Examination of Memoirs Contributing to the History of M. de Voltaire' (1787).

These texts circulated in manuscript form at the end of the eighteenth century, and were edited in 1826 by two of Voltaire's greatest editors, Beuchot and Decroix. They were considered to be 'one of the most reliable sources for the biography of Voltaire', and Wagnière was recognised by the scholarly community as 'the only living dictionary of all that took place in the final twenty-four years of the most celebrated man of our times'. However no critical edition of these texts was produced - Beuchot and Decroix both rewrote them rather than editing them. Pierre Beaumarchais set out to publish Voltaire's complete works and Wagnière made repeated attempts to furnish him with various texts of interest to his project. However his attempts were fruitless and nothing he sent to Beaumarchais was included in the Kehl Edition of Voltaire's works.

On 9 December 1792, Wagnière was elected mayor of Ferney-Voltaire.
