= Château de Voltaire =

Château in Ain, France

Coordinates: 46°15′27″N 6°06′13″E

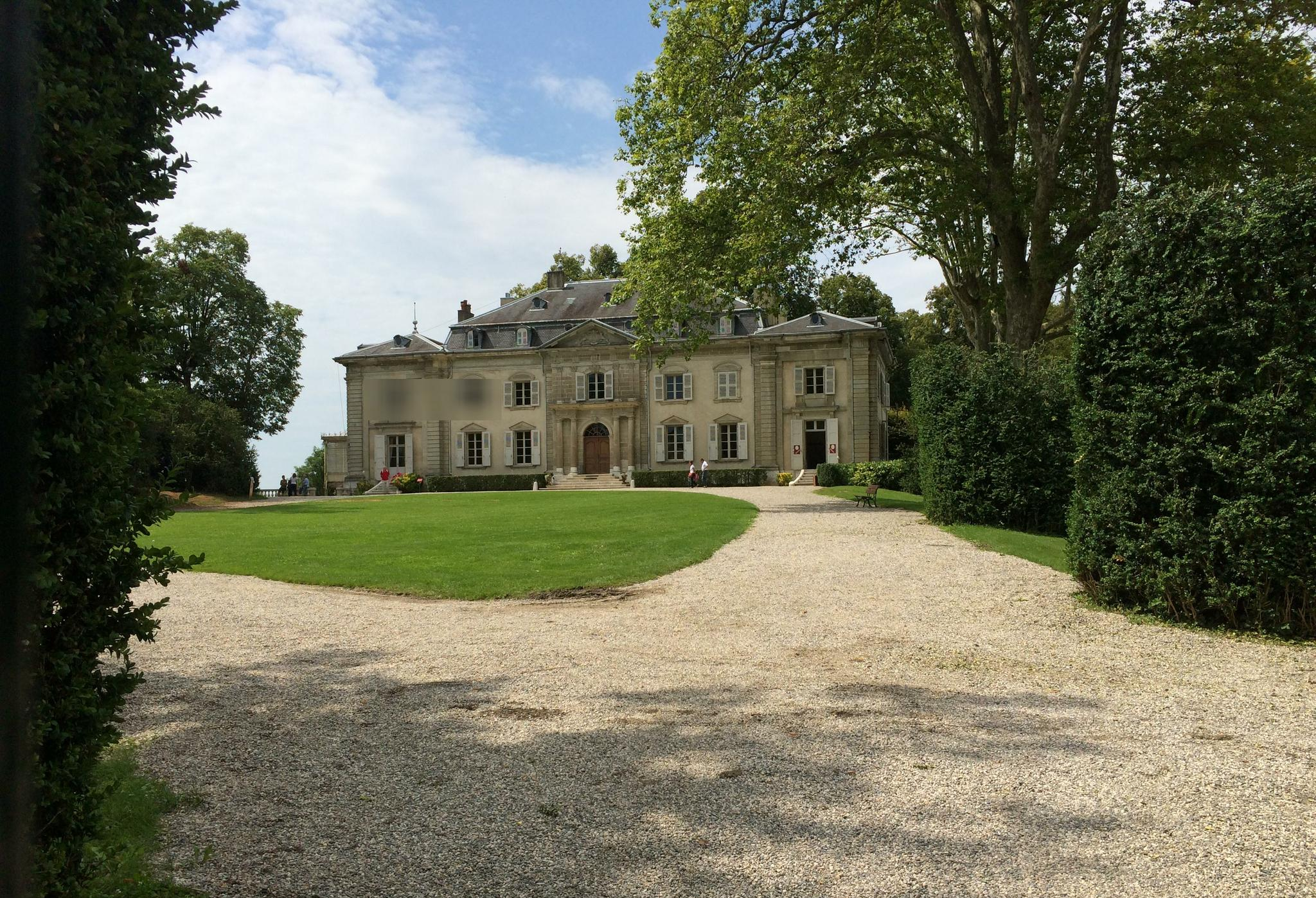
Castle of Voltaire in Ferney-Voltaire, France

The Château de Voltaire is located in Ferney-Voltaire (Ain) in France, close to the border with Switzerland and the city of Geneva. It was Voltaire's home between 1761 and 1778. It was listed as a historical monument in 1958 and acquired by the French State in 1999.

== History to 1778 ==
There are traces of an older manor house dating from the fourteenth century. In the fifteenth century the Duke of Savoy established a seigneury here. The domain was acquired by several Genevan families over time, including the Chevallier family in 1594 and the Budé family in 1674.

In 1755 Voltaire bought a property in Geneva he called Les Délices. However he soon felt that his position in the Republic of Geneva was not secure, particularly after the publication of the article "Geneva" in the Encyclopédie, a project in which Voltaire was a collaborator. He therefore sought a new place to live that would allow him a safe distance from the authorities in Paris while avoiding the inconveniences of living in Geneva. Ferney was a good compromise - Voltaire could remain close to his Geneva doctors and printers. He bought the estate from Guillaume de Budé in 1758 in the name of his niece for tax reasons. Working with Geneva architect Jean-Michel Billon, he razed the existing structure and built the core of the current building before settling there in 1761. Five years later, in 1766, wanting more space, he had the architect fr:Léonard Racle add the two wings, completing the current footprint of the building and removing the last vestiges of the older structure.

On the ground floor were the living rooms. To the south: the antechamber, the living room, Voltaire's bedroom and an impressive library with nearly 7,000 books. To the north, past the main salon, was a small room for paintings and the apartments of Mme Denis (Voltaire's niece and companion). The basement, at garden level, included the kitchens and storerooms. The first floor was for guest rooms and the second floor had servants' rooms. The third floor was an attic.

== History 1778–1999 ==
Following Voltaire's death, Mme Denis sold the estate to the Marquis de Villette. He transformed the place into a memorial to the philosopher, installing a cenotaph in the living room. The furniture was all sold off, and the library was bought in its entirety by Catherine the Great and transferred to Saint Petersburg where it can now be seen in the Hermitage Museum.

In the nineteenth century, the Lambert family combined the dining room and library to form one large living room. A fireplace was installed and an adjoining veranda offered a panorama of the Alps with Mont-Blanc at its centre. Voltaire's bedroom and that of his valet were also joined to form the current cabinet of paintings. Part of the basement kitchens was turned into a laboratory by a member of the Lambert family who was a chemist.

== History since 1999 ==
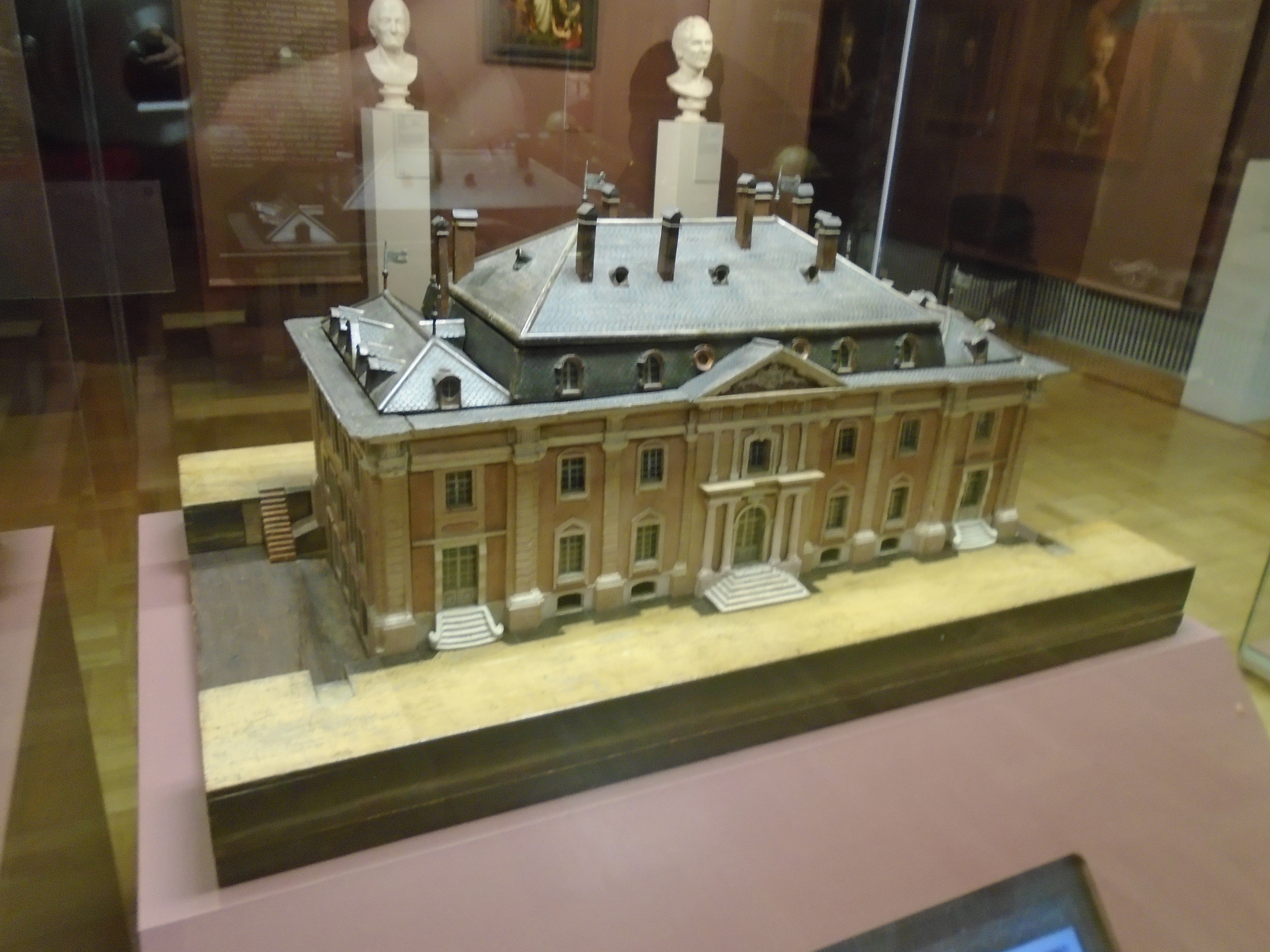
Model of the château

Bought by the State in 1999, the estate was used for a few years by the Auberge de l'Europe Association as an artists' residence.

In 2007 the fr: Centre des monuments nationaux took over management of the building and undertook a series of restoration works. In 2012 the orangery was restored and in 2013 structural work was undertaken in the chapel. From 2015 to 2018, restoration was ongoing. Parquet floors, doorframes and roofing were removed and a temporary canopy covered the building to protect it from bad weather. Work on the structure and the interior was informed by reference to a very accurate model, made by a servant of Voltaire, bought by Catherine II of Russia and kept in Saint Petersburg, along with measured plans by the architect Leonard Racles and samples of upholstery and fabrics. On May 31, 2018, after three years of closure, the house was formally reopened by President Emmanuel Macron.

== Individual structures ==
=== Chapel ===
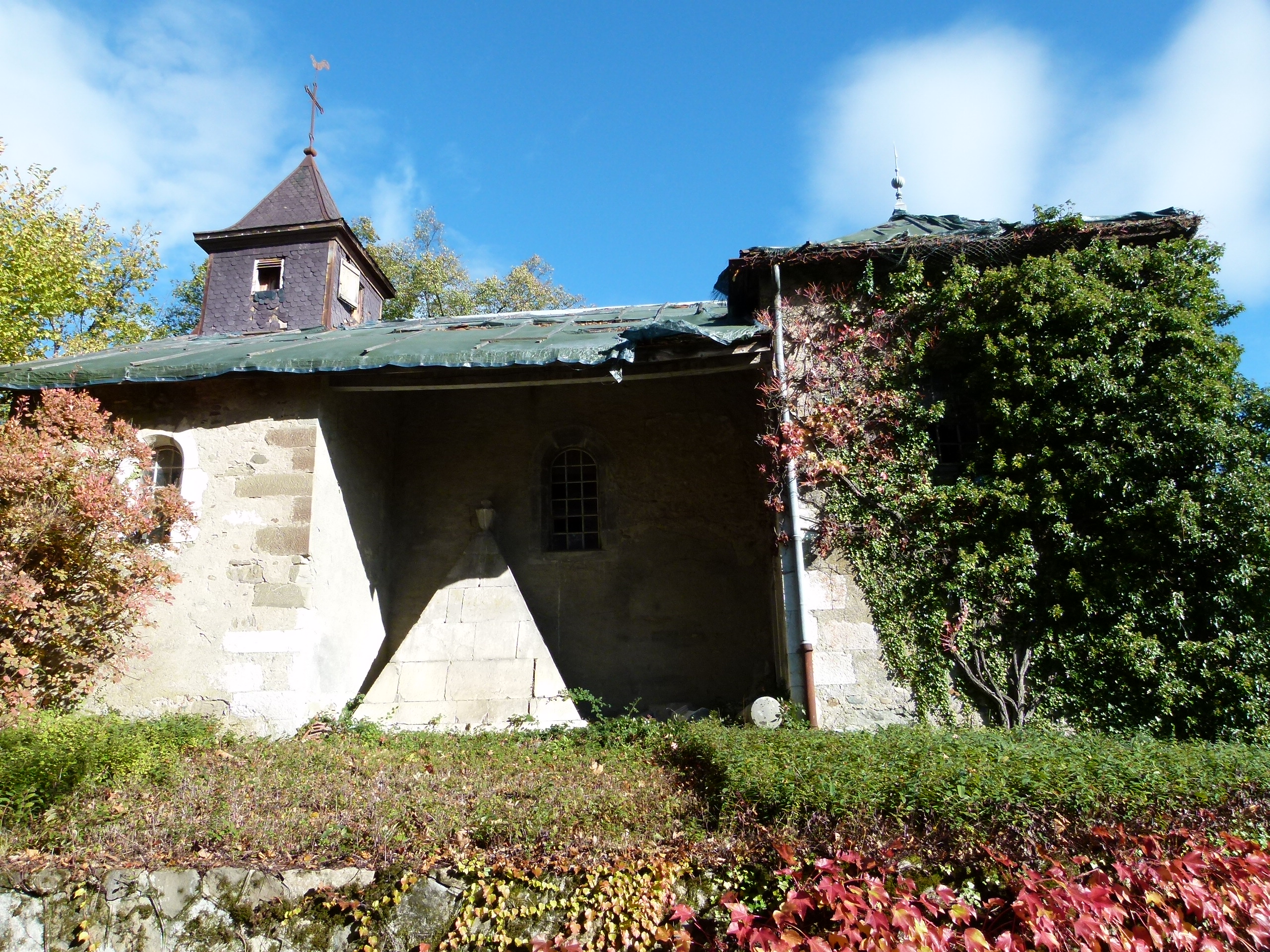
The chapel

The main part of the chapel present today was built by Voltaire in 1761. He had demolished an older parish church on the same site to clear the view from the front of his house, but was forced by the church authorities to build a replacement. Annoyed, Voltaire affixed on the pediment a plaque with the motto "Deo erexit Voltaire" ("Erected to God by Voltaire"), with his name written larger than that of God. He described it as "... the only church in the universe which is dedicated to God alone. All the others are dedicated to saints. For me, I prefer to build a church to the master rather than to his servants". He had his tomb built, in the shape of a pyramid, on the side of the building ("Evil people will say that I am neither inside nor outside") though his body was never placed there since he died during a final visit to Paris. The facade with double towers disappeared during the French Revolution and the central bell tower dates from 1806.

=== Orangery, greenhouse and palmarium ===
The orangery is made up of two rooms, one of which is in the basement. The main room is entered from the upper terrace of the gardens. Today it is used for art exhibitions, concerts, conferences, theatrical performances and private events. It was renovated in 2012–2013.

The palmarium has disappeared, but traces remain of the structure and its ironwork on the ground behind the reception-bookstore-boutique building. The greenhouse is more recent and is still used for its original function by the Jardins de Voltaire, an association for disabled workers.

=== Caretaker's pavilion ===
In 1882, the Lambert family obtained permission to reroute the Moëns road, finally making it possible to fulfill Voltaire's wish and to modify access to the chateau. The caretaker's pavilion was built in 1885 near the new entrance by the Geneva architect de:Jacques-Elysée Goss at the request of Emile Lambert, owner of the castle from 1879 to 1897. It was completely restored between 2007 and 2008.

=== Theatre ===
In 1760-61 Voltaire converted a barn near the château into a private theatre. This theatre presented the premieres of various plays authored by Voltaire, and he used this local stage to test his work before making any changes and having it performed in Paris. Following a later expansion it could accommodate up to 200 spectators to the great pleasure of the Genevans, whose Republic had banned the theatre. While Voltaire still resided at Ferney the theatre was repurposed as a silk factory and the entire structure was demolished in 1798.

== Park ==
The park of the estate extends over seven hectares, allowing Voltaire to develop several spaces, including an arbour behind the house, an orchard, and several ponds. Voltaire improved the park throughout his time at Ferney. He had some trees cleared in order to open up the view of the Alps and Mont-Blanc, and also built and planted a number of notable features such as the arbour, a formal garden, and a large terrace. Below the terraces was his vineyard, now undergoing redevelopment. He spent a lot of his time in the park, planting, gardening, and walking the avenue of hornbeams he had planted, where he sought inspiration and organised his thoughts.

In 2018, the estate was certified as a refuge by the League for the Protection of Birds. This initiative supports the promotion of biodiversity, conservation and restoration.

== Exhibitions ==
Since 2018 and the reopening of the castle, exhibitions have been held every year and complete the visit, allowing visitors to discover new spaces such as the garden level or part of the first floor.

- Voltaire chez lui (Voltaire at home): from May 30 to November 24, 2019
- Parcs des Lumières, Voltaire en ses terres (Parcs des Lumières, Voltaire on his land): from July 13, 2020, to January 3, 2021
- La Henriade: from December 21, 2019, to October 31, 2020
- 100 ans Genève aéroport (Exhibition of photographs - 100 years of Geneva airport): from September 25, 2020, to October 4, 2020
- Histoire dessinée, le XVIIIe siècle dans la bande dessinée (Comic history, the 18th century in comics): from May 29 to September 12, 2021
- 25 ans Dreamworks animation (25 years DreamWorks animation): from May 19 to August 31, 2021
- Ecrire l'histoire : Voltaire et les rois (Writing history: Voltaire and the kings): from September 16, 2021, to March 20, 2022,
- Léonard Racle, l'ingénieux (Léonard Racle, the ingenious): from November 18, 2021, to April 30, 2022
- L'humanité au-delà de la couleur, Sabine Jaccard (Humanity Beyond Color; Sabine Jaccard: March 2 to April 30, 2022

== 18th century guests and visitors to the château ==
- Thomas Abbt, mathematician and writer
- John Crosse (priest)
- Axel von Fersen the Younger, statesman
- Jean-Pierre Claris de Florian, poet, novelist and fabulist
- Jean-François de La Harpe, playwright, writer and literary critic
- Louis-Alexandre de Launay, comte d'Antraigues, diplomat
- Henry Temple, 2nd Viscount Palmerston, politician
- Reine Philiberte de Varicourt, friend of Voltaire and Mme Denis
- Jacob Vernes, pastor
- Charles, marquis de Villette, writer and politician
- Augustin Louis de Ximénès, poet and playwright

== See also ==
- Chateau de Cirey
- Les Délices
- The Apotheosis of Voltaire
