= Vieillard =

Vieillard is a French surname. Notable people with the surname include:

- Antoine Vieillard de Boismartin (1747–1815), French lawyer and playwright
- Eugène Vieillard (1819–1896), French physician and botanist
- Pierre-Ange Vieillard (1778–1862), French poet, playwright and literary critic

== See also ==
- Jean-Louis Vieillard-Baron (born 1944), French philosopher
