= De Varicourt =

De Varicourt is a surname. Notable people with the surname include:

- Pierre-Marin Rouph de Varicourt, French Catholic priest
- Reine Philiberte de Varicourt, French woman of letters, sister of Pierre-Marin
