= Tronchin =

Tronchin may refer to:

- Hélène Tronchin (1828–1905), salonnière and feminist from Geneva
- Louis Tronchin (1629–1705), theologian from Geneva
- Théodore Tronchin (1709–1781), a physician from the Republic of Geneva
- Jean-Robert Tronchin (1710–1793), an attorney general of the Republic of Geneva
- Théodore Tronchin (theologian) (1582–1657), a Calvinist theologian in the Republic of Geneva
