= Véronique (film) =

1950 film

- Directed by: Robert Vernay
- Written by: Jean Ferry; Claude-André Puget
- Based on: Véronique by Georges Duval and Albert Vanloo
- Produced by: Hubert d'Achon
- Starring: Jean Desailly; Marina Hotine; Gisèle Pascal
- Cinematography: René Gaveau
- Edited by: Marthe Poncin
- Music by: André Messager
- Production company: Productions Jason
- Distributed by: Latino Consortium Cinema
- Release date: 1 September 1950
- Running time: 100 minutes
- Country: France
- Language: French

Véronique is a 1950 French historical musical comedy film directed by Robert Vernay and starring Jean Desailly, Marina Hotine and Gisèle Pascal. An operetta film, it is based on the 1888 work Véronique composed by André Messager with a libretto by Georges Duval and Albert Vanloo. The film's sets were designed by the art director René Moulaert.

== Cast ==
- Jean Desailly as Florestan
- Marina Hotine as Véronique
- Gisèle Pascal as Estelle
- Mila Parély as Agathe
- Jean Marchat as Le baron
- Pierre Bertin as Croquenard
- Denis d'Inès as Le marquis
- Roland Armontel as Loustot
- Noël Roquevert as Joseph
- Philippe Richard as Le bourgeois
- Maurice Schutz as Le vieux gentilhomme
- Made Siamé as Mme Hortense
- Sylvain as Sergent Mercier
- Jean Témerson as Me Corbin
- Paul Villé as L'aubergiste
- Sophie Leclair as Une vendeuse
- Yette Lucas as Une invitée
- Albert Malbert as Le gardien
- Christiane Mayo as Sylvie
- Daniel Mendaille as Le directeur de la prison
- Jane Morlet as La femme de l'aubergiste
- Henri Coutet as Le garçon
- Max Dalban as Le déménageur
- Arthur Devère as Le cocher

== Bibliography ==
- Goble, Alan. The Complete Index to Literary Sources in Film. Walter de Gruyter, 1999.
- Rège, Philippe. Encyclopedia of French Film Directors, Volume 1. Scarecrow Press, 2009.
