= Cosimo Alessandro Collini =

Italian historian

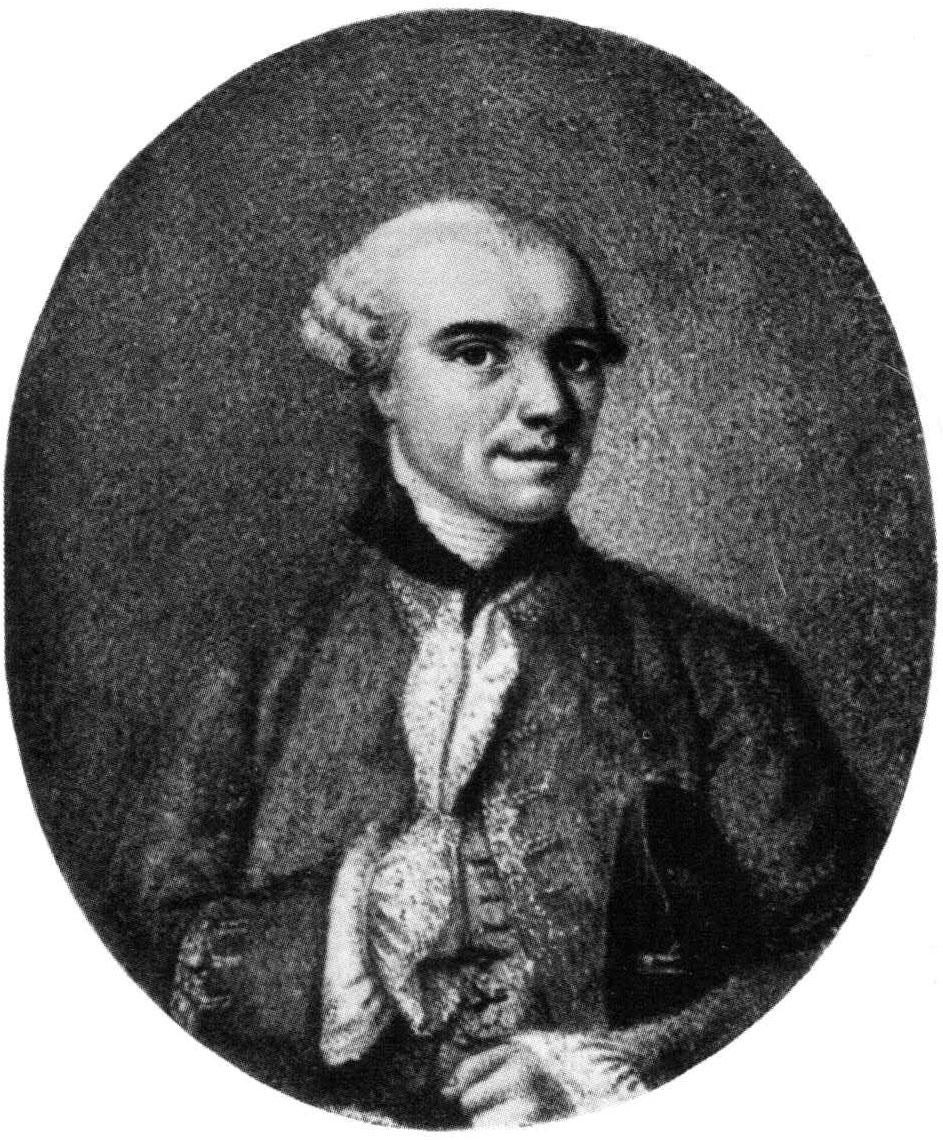
Portrait of Collini, artist unknown

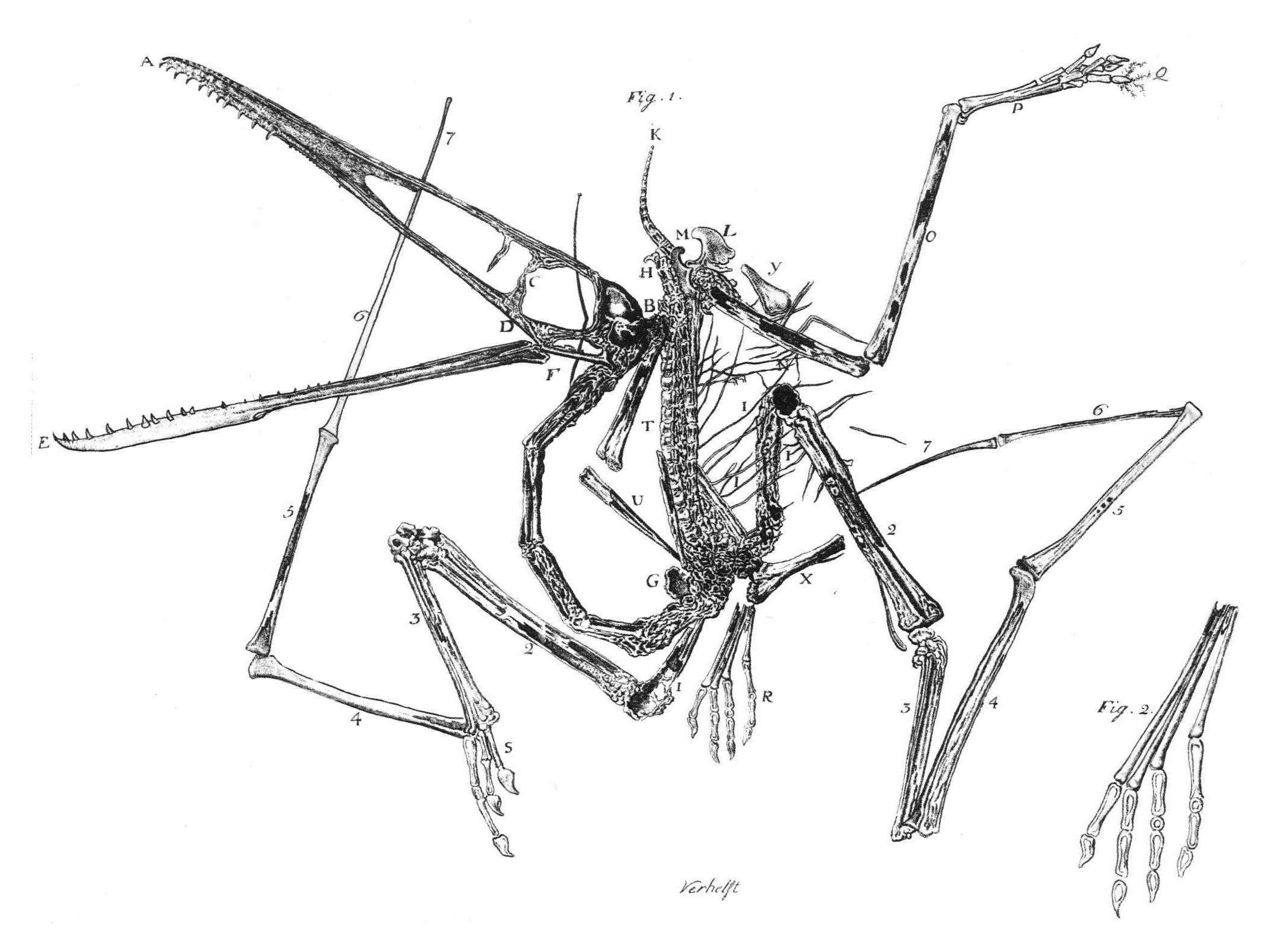
Pterodactyl drawn by Collini in 1784

Cosimo Alessandro Collini (Florence, 14 October 1727-Mannheim, 21 March 1806) was an Italian historian and Voltaire's secretary from 1752 to 1756.

== Life ==
Collini was born into a noble family and studied law.

He met Voltaire in Berlin in 1750 and was taken on as his secretary, alongside Joseph Du Fresne de Francheville (son of another Joseph Du Fresne de Francheville), in April 1752. When Voltaire left the service of Frederick the Great in 1753 Collini accompanied him, and was confined with him and Madame Denis on Frederick's orders for three weeks in Frankfurt. In 1755 the young Jean-Louis Wagnière was made his assistant and, just over a year later, took his place when Collini was dismissed from Voltaire's service for insulting Madame Denis.

Collini then entered the service of Charles Theodore, Elector of Bavaria as his private secretary and historiographer.

He staged Voltaire's Olympie at the Schlosstheater Schwetzingen in 1762.

In 1763 he became a member of the Palatine Academy of Sciences and director of the Mannheim Cabinet of Natural History. In 1784 he was the first person to describe the pterosaur that Georges Cuvier went on to identify, seventeen years later, as a flying reptile.

In his later years, he denounced the fanaticism of the French revolutionary wars and in 1799 he defended the collections in his cabinet from destruction, and managed to have them transferred, four years later, to Munich.

A street in Mannheim is named after him, as is the Collini-Center development in the city.

== Publications ==
- Discours sur l’histoire d’Allemagne (Frankfurt, Koch und Esslinger, 1761).
- Précis de l’histoire du Palatinat du Rhin (Frankfurt und Leipzig, 1763).
- Éloge de Charles-Théodore, Électeur Palatin (1764).
- Description physique et économique de la ville de Mannheim (Acta Academiae Theodoro-Palatinae, vol. 1, 1766, p. 440).
- Dissertation historique et critique sur le prétendu cartel, ou lettre de défi envoyée par Charles-Louis Électeur au Vicomte de Turenne (Mannheim, 1767).
- Sur l'incertitude de l'histoire naturelle (Acta Academiae Theodoro-Palatinae, vol. 2, 1770, p. 497).
- Solution du problème du cavalier au jeu des échecs (Mannheim, Loeffler, 1773).
- Description de quelques encrinités de cabinet d'histoire naturelle de S.A.S. Mgr. l'électeur palatin (Acta Academiae Theodoro-Palatinae, vol. 3 Phys., 1775, p. 69).
- Journal d'un voyage qui contient différentes observations minéralogiques, particulièrement sur les agates et le basalte. Avec un détail sur la manière de travailler les agates (Mannheim, Schwann, 1776).
- Considérations sur les montagnes volcaniques (Mannheim, 1781).
- Sur quelques zoolithes du cabinet d'histoire naturelle de S.A.S.E. palatine et de Bavière, à Mannheim (Acta Academiae Theodoro-Palatinae, vol. 5 Phys., 1784, p. 58).
- Pensées sur la transmutation des substances du règne minéral (Acta Academiae Theodoro-Palatinae, vol. 5 Phys., 1784, p. 104).
- Sur le tarentisme (Acta Academiae Theodoro-Palatinae, vol. 5 Phys., 1784, p. 364).
- Description de deux jumelles adhérentes l'une à l'autre, venues au monde dans le Palatinat du Rhin (Acta Academiae Theodoro-Palatinae, vol. 5 Phys., 1784, p. 389).
- Remarques adressées aux auteurs de ce Journal sur un ouvrage publié l'année dernière (Journal encyclopédique, 15 March 1785, p. 506), letter dated 15 December 1784.
- Voyage en Allemagne, dans une suite de lettres, par M. le Baron de Riesbeck; traduites de l'Anglais; avec portraits, plans & cartes en taille-douce (Paris, Buisson, 1788).
- Lettres sur les Allemands (Hamburg, 1790).
- Coup d'œil sur la chaine graduelle des êtres naturels (Acta Academiae Theodoro-Palatinae, vol. 6 Phys., 1790, p. 267).
- Sur les inondations du Necker près de Mannheim, avec preuves et éclaircissements (Acta Academiae Theodoro-Palatinae, vol. 6 Phys., 1790, p. 282).
- Relation d'un effet causé par le grand froid de l'année 1789 (Acta Academiae Theodoro-Palatinae, vol. 6 Phys., 1790, p. 304).
- Discours, lu dans une séance de cet institut littéraire le 16 avril 1799 à l'occasion de la mort de Charles Théodore, Électeur palatin (Mannheim, 1799).
- Remarques sur la pierre élastique du Brésil (Mannheim, 1805).
- Mon séjour auprès de Voltaire et lettres inédites (Paris, 1807).
