= Auger (surname) =

Auger is a French surname. Notable people with the surname include:

- Albert Auger (1889–1917), French-Algerian World War I flying ace
- Anne Auger, French computer scientist
- Arleen Auger (1939–1993), American soprano
- Athanase Auger (1734–1792), French educator and translator
- Antoine-Augustin Auger (1761–1836), French politician
- Brian Auger (born 1939), British jazz and rock keyboardist
- Claudine Auger (1941–2019), French cinematic actress
- Edmond Auger (1530–1591), French Jesuit
- Félix Auger-Aliassime (born 2000), Canadian tennis player, brother of Malika
- Gerald Auger (born 1978), Canadian actor and producer
- Henry Lemaître Auger (1873–1948), Canadian politician
- Isabelle Auger (born 1969), Canadian water polo player
- John Auger (c. 1678–1718), pirate
- Joseph-Oscar Auger (1873–1942), Canadian politician
- Langdon Auger, stage name of Scott Langejan, Canadian rap musician
- Louis-Mathias Auger (1902–1966), Canadian teacher and politician
- Louis-Simon Auger (1772–1839), French journalist and playwright
- Ludovic Auger (born 1971), French racing cyclist
- Michel Auger (politician) (1830–1909), Canadian politician, farmer and industrialist
- Michel Auger (1944–2020), Canadian crime reporter
- Michel C. Auger, Canadian political columnist
- Pierre Victor Auger (1899–1993), French physicist and discoverer of the Auger effect
- Pierre-Michel Auger (born 1963), Canadian politician
- Stéphane Auger (born 1970), Canadian ice hockey referee
- Tito Auger (born 1968), Puerto-Rican musician

== See also ==
- Daniel d'Auger de Subercase (1661–1732), French naval officer
