= Société littéraire typographique de Kehl =

French publishing house (1780 to 1790)

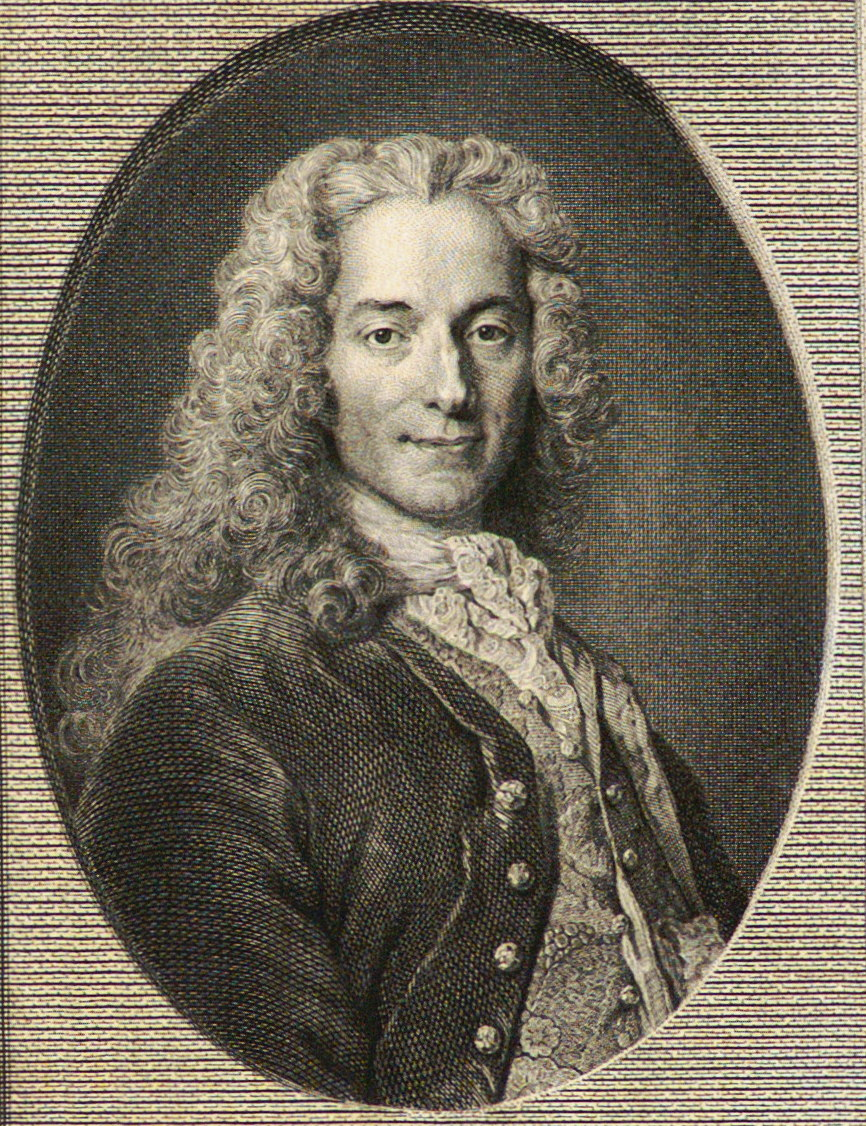
- Portrait of Voltaire by Moreau le Jeune on the front of Volume I of the Œuvres complètes
- Status: defunct
- Founded: 1780
- Founders: Pierre-Augustin Caron de Beaumarchais and Nicolas de Condorcet
- Defunct: 1790
- Country of origin: Margraviate of Baden
- Headquarters location: Kehl, Margraviate of Baden
- Distribution: Europe
- Publication types: Voltaire's work

The Société littéraire typographique de Kehl was a publishing house founded by Pierre-Augustin Caron de Beaumarchais and Nicolas de Condorcet for the sole purpose of publishing an edition of Voltaire's Œuvres complètes. It moved into the Kehl, owned by the Margraviate of Baden, to escape Louis XVI's censorship. In operation from 1780 to 1790, it was at its peak the largest printing works in Europe, with 40 presses and nearly 200 employees.

Despite an outcry from the clergy, a royal ban, the embezzlement of funds by the director of the printing works, the flight of the cashier, attempts at counterfeiting, Russian and Prussian political pressure, a betrayal by Voltaire's last secretary, and major technical problems, publication, albeit years behind schedule, was completed.

== Objectives ==
The aim of the Société littéraire typographique was to design and publish a new edition of Voltaire's works, bringing together all unpublished texts, published anonymously or under pseudonym, as well as his correspondence and autobiographical texts.

The project was openly militant: against the adversaries of reason and the progress of the human spirit, the aim was to disseminate Voltaire's thought, to defend and perpetuate his memory, to "erect a monument to the glory of this beautiful genius".

== Organisation ==
Beaumarchais is the director of the Société, and acts on commercial, financial and political levels. Condorcet works as scientific director of publishing. They are assisted by Nicolas Ruault, in Paris, in charge of distribution, and Jacques Joseph Marie Decroix, in Lille. Jean-François Le Tellier ran the Kehl printing works from 1779 to 1784. From 1785, he was replaced by Jacques-Gilbert de La Hogue. Panckoucke, the bookseller who had acquired and sold the manuscripts and publishing rights to Beaumarchais, remained his partner until 1785, as technical and commercial advisor.

The Kehl establishment was one of the first to include all stages of book production, from papermaking to printing, assembly and bookbinding.

From a legal standpoint, the company was no more than a phantom entity, with no legal existence, no contract and no outline: the trademark was used for official representation and to preserve anonymity.

=== Commercial, financial and political management ===
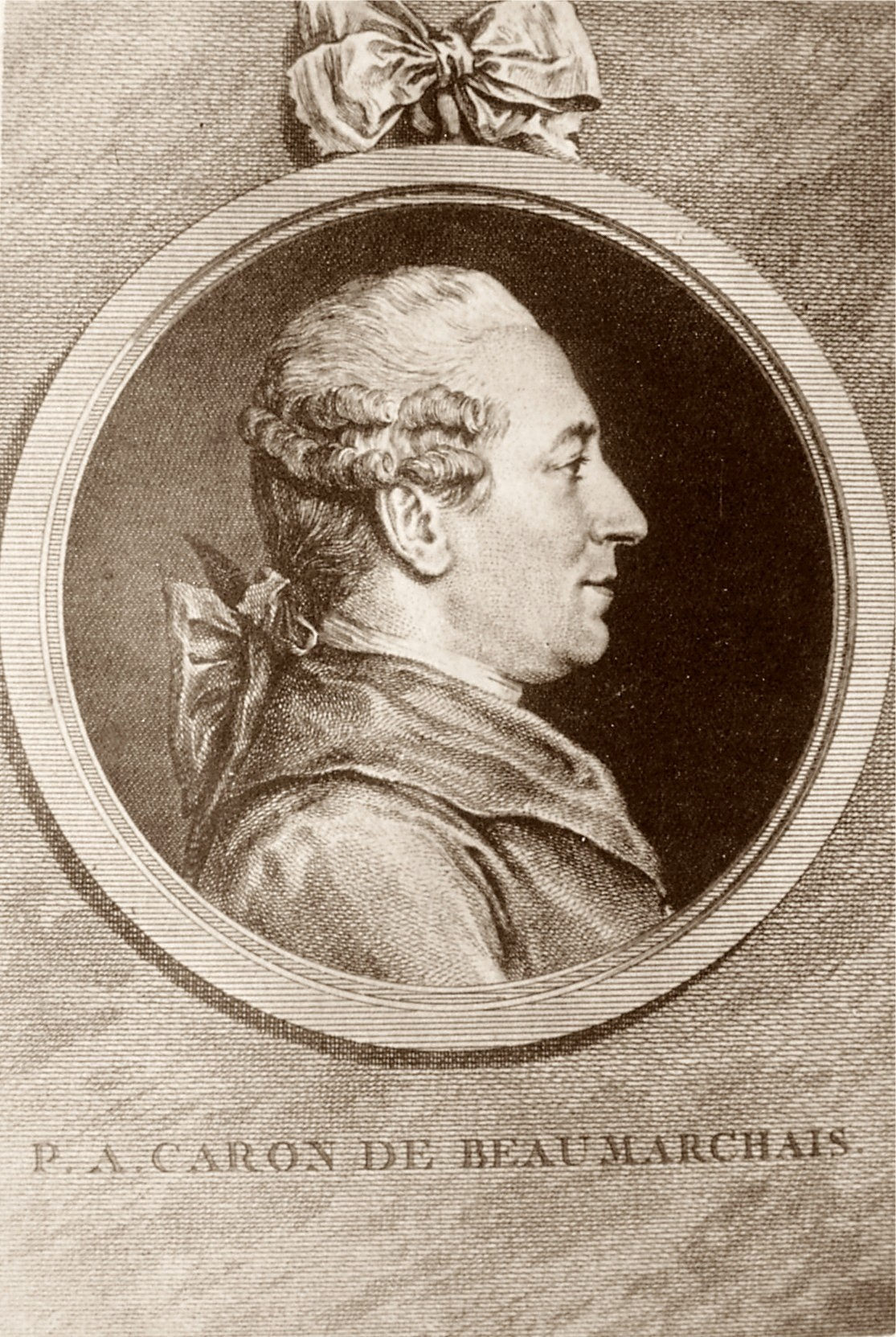
Beaumarchais

Beaumarchais, styling himself as the company's "Correspondent General ", was its driving force. He was responsible for being the guarantor of its guiding principles. He was in charge of advertising and public relations, shipping, paper selection, typography, personnel selection and conflict arbitration. Unreasonable in the eyes of publishing professionals, the venture was successful.

Only an amateur could embark on an adventure that a professional like Panckoucke had given up on. Paradoxically, his strength lay in the fact that he was not a professional. He was thus able to mobilize substantial financial resources and face up to the "sorrows" and "disgusts" of this "disastrous printing business", which "poisoned his existence in every possible way", which "exhausted him to the bone", because "the fear of mediocrity poisoned [his] life".

According to François Bessire, writing in the Revue de l'Histoire littéraire de la France, "By editing Voltaire as no author had ever been edited before, Beaumarchais took a place in the Enlightenment movement that his own work alone would not have secured for him. By its scope, by the difficulties of its implementation, by the ideological resistance it encountered, it had no equivalent in its century other than the Encyclopédie."

=== Scientific and editorial management ===
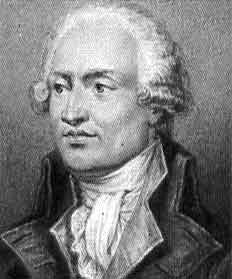
Condorcet

After meeting with Voltaire in the autumn of 1770, Condorcet became his disciple and collaborator. He publicly defended Voltaire in the face of public opinion manipulated by the anti-philosophists. He met Panckoucke through Panckouke's own sister, Amélie Suard.

Condorcet became Panckoucke's scientific editor on the recommendation of D'Alembert. A contract with Panckoucke was signed on November 29, 1778. His task was to write prefaces and notes, mainly in the philosophical, historical and scientific sections, and to produce a biography of Voltaire. His fifty Avertissements and three hundred notes, often lengthy, are openly militant in spirit. He is responsible for organizing the volumes and selecting the correspondence, according to criteria of prudence, propriety and respect for private individuals. He is also responsible for putting the so-called alphabetical works in order, by merging several texts, mainly the Dictionnaire philosophique and the Questions on the Encyclopédie.

He was based at the Hôtel de la Monnaie, in an indescribably messy study: "It's hard to imagine a study more cluttered with papers than his. They're everywhere, on tables, chairs, armchairs and bergères. This mess leads to mistakes, delays and forgetting what you've got. But don't worry, nothing is lost or misplaced".

Condorcet has two assistants, Decroix et Ruault.

==== Editorial support ====
As early as 1775, Panckoucke proposed to his childhood friend Jacques-Joseph Marie Decroix, who was collecting Voltaire's scattered letters, to assist him in his initial project for a new edition of the works. Decroix accepted, on condition of “remaining absolutely unknown”, and of working under the direction of “a man of letters more capable of directing a literary enterprise of this scope.”

His status was ambiguous. After the sale of the manuscripts to Beaumarchais, Decroix remained in the employ of Panckoucke, who did not pay him on the pretext that he had other income as a receiver of the Chapter of Flanders. In 1787, he received a promise that his expenses would be reimbursed five years later, in 1792.

Nicolas Ruault, a native of Évreux who had moved to Paris, worked as a clerk for bookseller Claude Fosse and as a peddler from 1764. In 1767, he unsuccessfully applied for a bookseller's position, entered an apprenticeship in 1771 and was awarded a master's degree the following year. In the archives, there are references to disputes, lawsuits and debts. In 1779, after going bankrupt, he joined the service of Beaumarchais and became Condorcet's direct collaborator. He was responsible for assisting Condorcet in the preparation of the text, as well as overseeing material and typographical operations. He also ran the “magasin” for the first deliveries in 1785.

Ruault worked without a contract from 1779 to 1785, when his tasks were formalized, and his remuneration finally fixed: 2,000 livres per year and 5% on sales.

Decroix operated from Lille, while Ruault worked at the Hôtel de Hollande, acquired by Beaumarchais on rue Vieille-du-Temple, where Voltaire's manuscripts were kept in a double-locked safe. The hotel, where several clerks worked, was open to the public. Work was carried out in a small office, away from prying eyes and in a clandestine atmosphere. In 1785, when Beaumarchais was imprisoned for four days in the Saint-Lazare prison following the scandal caused by The Marriage of Figaro, the manuscripts were moved to the home of “a friend of Mad. de V.” for several months, which slowed down everyone's work.
