= Stanislas Champein =

French composer and politician

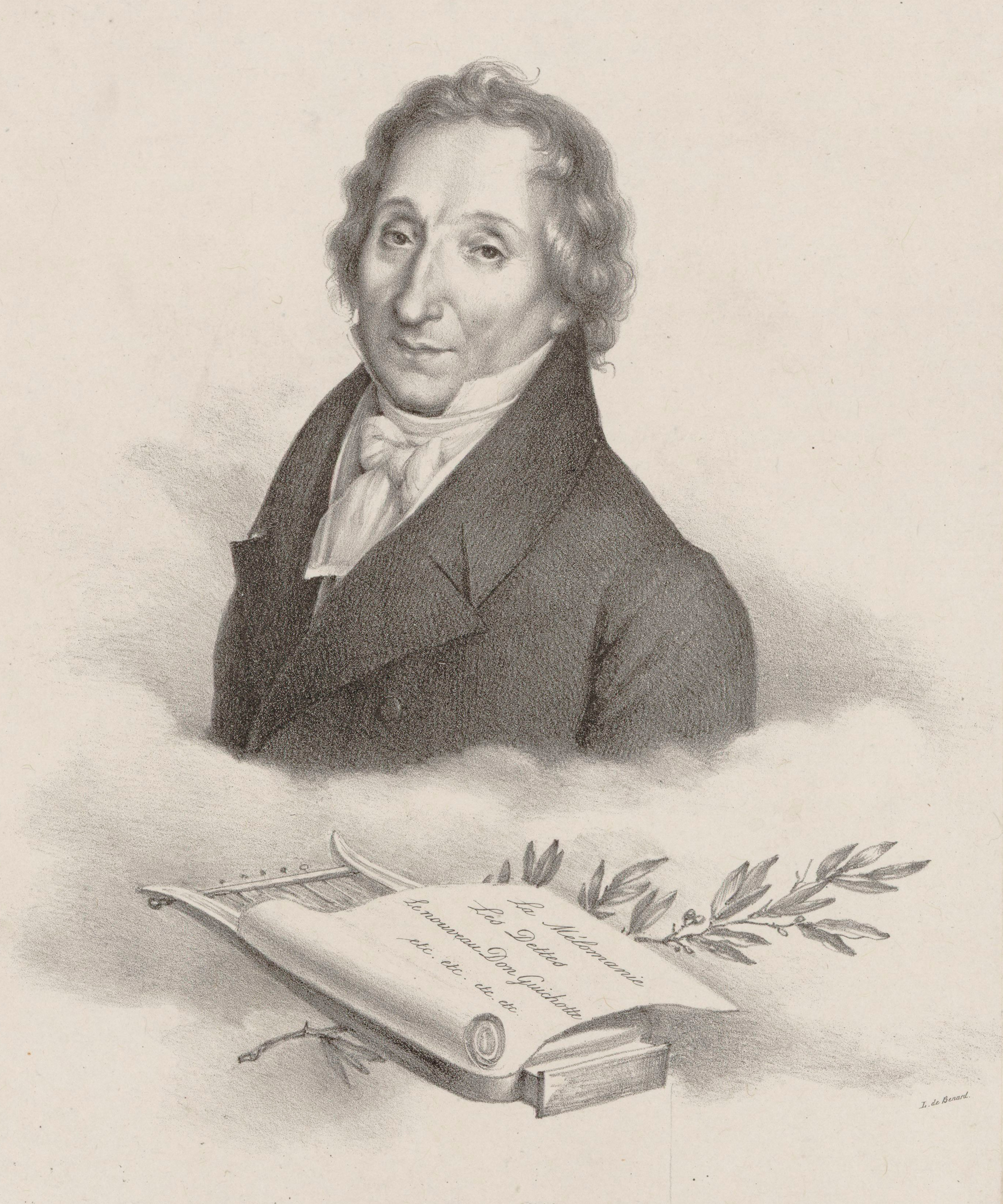
- Born: 19 November 1753; Marseille
- Died: 19 September 1830 (aged 76); Paris
- Occupations: Composer, politician

Stanislas Champein (19 November 1753 – 19 September 1830) was an 18th/19th-century French composer and politician. He was a member of the Institut de France.

In 1792, Champein joined the administration and was made a Prefect in Mainz.

== Works (selection) ==
He is known for several witty musical scores which were long part of the repertoire including:

- 1787: Les Dettes
- 1779: Le Soldat français, opéra comique
- 1781: La Mélomanie, parody of Italian music
- 1789: Le Nouveau Don Quixote which the author passed of as an Italian opera
- 1807: Laurette, one-act opera, libretto by Joseph Pain
