= Institut et Musée Voltaire =

Museum in Geneva, Switzerland

Coordinates: 46.2076°N 6.1335°E

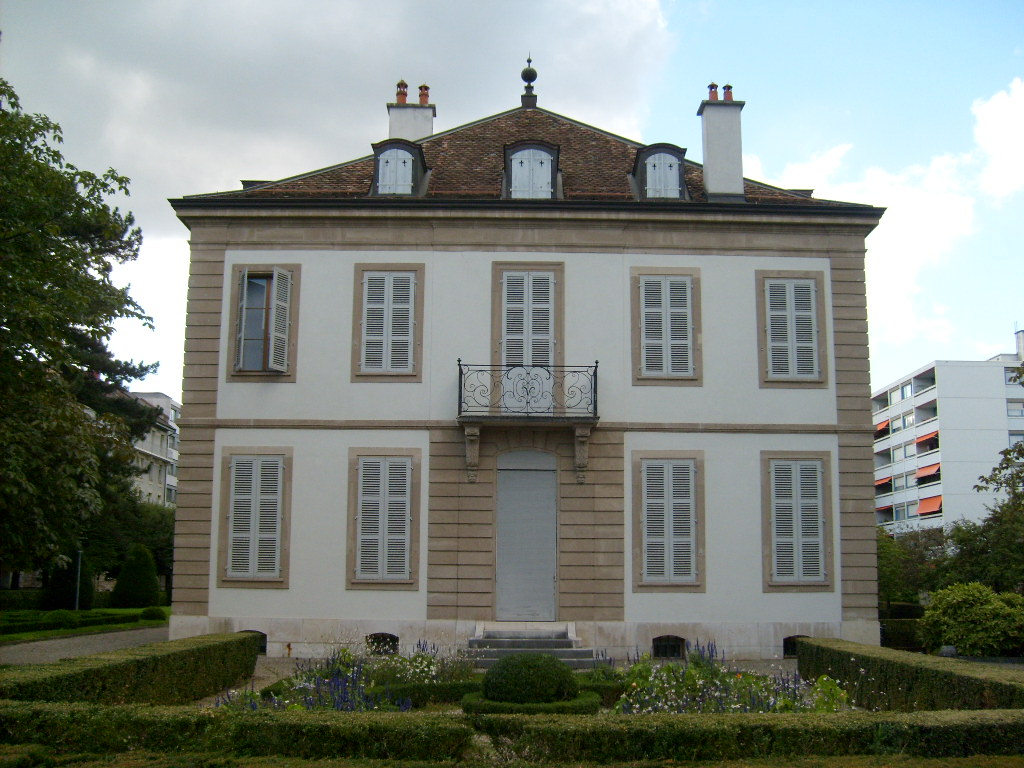
Institut et Musée Voltaire, les Délices

The Institut et Musée Voltaire is a museum in Geneva dedicated to the life and works of Voltaire. The museum is housed in Les Délices, which was Voltaire's home from 1755 until 1760.

The property was bought by the city of Geneva in 1929, and the museum opened in 1952, founded by Theodore Besterman.

It contains about 25,000 volumes on Voltaire and the 18th century as well as a collection of paintings and prints from the period, many depicting Voltaire, his relatives and acquaintances.

== See also ==
- List of museums in Switzerland
