= Joseph Pain =

French playwright, poet and essayist (1773–1830)

Marie Joseph Pain (4 August 1773, Paris – March 1830, ibid.) was a 19th-century French playwright, poet and essayist.

== Biography ==
A member of the Société du Caveau, censor and office manager at the Prefecture of the Seine under the Bourbon Restoration, chief editor of the magazine Le Drapeau blanc, he is known as one of the pioneers of vaudevillism. His plays, some of which achieved a major success, were presented on the most important Parisian stages of his time including the Théâtre du Vaudeville, the Théâtre du Gymnase-Dramatique, and the Théâtre des Variétés.

== Works ==
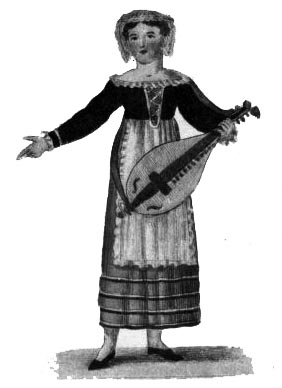
Elise Lindström in a Swedish adaptation of Fanchon the hurdy-gurdy girl

.

- 1792: Saint-Far, ou la Délicatesse de l'amour, comedy in 1 act, in verse
- 1794: Les Chouans, ou La Républicaine de Malestroit, with François Marie Joseph Riou de Kersalaün
- 1794: Le Naufrage au port, comedy in 1 act, mingled with vaudevilles
- 1798: Le Roi de pique, comedy in 1 act and in verse
- 1798: L'Appartement à louer, comedy épisodique mingled with vaudevilles
- 1799: Le Connaisseur, comedy in 1 act, mingled with vaudevilles
- 1799: La Marchande de plaisir, vaudeville in 1 act
- 1800: Florian, comedy in 1 act, in prose, mingled with vaudevilles, with Jean-Nicolas Bouilly
- 1800: Téniers, comedy in 1 act and in prose, mingled with vaudevilles, with Bouilly
- 1801: Allez voir Dominique, comedy in 1 act, mingled with vaudevilles
- 1802: Berquin, ou l'Ami des enfans, comedy in 1 act, in prose, mingled with vaudevilles, with Bouilly
- 1802: Le Méléagre champenois, ou la Chasse interrompue, folie-vaudeville in 1 act
- 1802: Le Procès, ou la Bibliothèque de Patru, comedy in 1 act, in prose, mingled with vaudevilles
- 1803: Fanchon la vielleuse, comedy in 3 acts, mingled with vaudeville, with Bouilly
- 1804: Théophile, ou les Deux poètes, comedy in 1 act and in prose, mingled with vaudevilles, with Théophile Marion Dumersan
- 1805: La Belle Marie, comédie-anecdote in 1 act, mingled with vaudevilles, with Dumersan
- 1805: Le Portrait du duc, comedy in 3 acts and in prose, with Ludwig Benedict Franz von Bilderbeck
- 1806: Brutal, ou Il vaut mieux tard que jamais, vaudeville in 1 act and in prose, parodie of Uthal, with Pierre-Ange Vieillard
- 1806: Point d'adversaire, opéra comique in 1 act
- 1807: Amour et mystère, ou Lequel est mon cousin ?, comedy in 1 act, mingled with vaudevilles
- 1807: Laurette, opera in 1 act, music by Stanislas Champein
- 1808: La Chaumière moscovite, vaudeville anecdote in 1 act, with Dumersan
- 1808: Rien de trop, comedy in 1 act, in prose, mingled with vaudevilles
- 1809: Benoît ou Le pauvre de Notre Dame, comédie-anecdote in 2 acts and in prose, mingled with vaudevilles, with Dumersan
- 1809: Le Roi et le pèlerin, comedy in 2 acts and in prose, mingled with vaudevilles, with Dumersan
- 1809: Le Manuscrit déchiré, bagatelle (trifle) in 1 act, in prose
- 1810: Le Père d'occasion, comedy in 1 act, with Vieillard
- 1810: La Vieillesse de Piron, comedy in 1 act, in prose, mingled with vaudevilles, with Bouilly
- 1810: L'Homme de quarante ans, ou Le Rôle de comédie, comedy in 1 act, mingled with vaudevilles
- 1810: Encore une partie de chasse, ou le Tableau d'histoire, comédie-anecdote in 1 act, in verse, with Dumersan
- 1810: Deux pour un, comedy in 1 act mingled with vaudevilles, with Henri Dupin
- 1810: Rien de trop ou Les Deux paravents, opéra comique in 1 act, music by François-Adrien Boïeldieu
- 1811: Le Dîner d'emprunt, ou Les lettres de Carnaval, vaudeville in 1 act, with Dupin
- 1812: Les Mines de Beaujonc, ou Ils sont sauvés, fait historique in 3 acts, mingled with couplets, with Dumersan
- 1813: Les Rêveurs éveillés, parade magnétique in 1 act, mingled with vaudevilles, with Vieillard
- 1816: Le Revenant, ou l'Héritage, comédie-vaudeville in 1 act, in prose, with Dupin
- 1818: La Statue de Henri IV, ou la Fête du Pont-Neuf, tableau grivois in 1 act, with René de Chazet, Marc-Antoine Désaugiers and Michel-Joseph Gentil de Chavagnac
- 1819: Voyage au hasard
- 1820: Poésies de M. Joseph Pain
- 1823: Jenny la Bouquetière, opéra comique, with Bouilly
- 1826: Le Bonhomme, comedy in 1 act, mingled with couplets, with Pierre Carmouche and Antoine Simonnin
- 1828: Nouveaux tableaux de Paris, ou Observations sur les mœurs et usages des Parisiens au commencement du XIXe siècle, 2 vols
- 1844: Adieux à l'Aveyron, in Poésies aveyronnaises by Adrien de Séguret

== Bibliography ==
- Joseph-Marie Quérard, La France littéraire ou Dictionnaire bibliographique des savants, 1834, p. 556-557
- Marie-Nicolas Bouillet, Dictionnaire universel d'histoire et de géographie, vol.2, 1867, p. 1410
- Charles Dezobry, Théodore Bachelet, Dictionnaire général de biographie et d'histoire, vol.2, 1873, p. 2000
- John Oxenford, The Book of French Songs, 1877, p. 222
- Henry Gidel, Le vaudeville, 1986, p. 54
