= Étienne-Auguste Dossion =

French playwright and poet (1770–1832)

- Born: 9 August 1770; Paris, France
- Died: 3 October 1832 (aged 62); Paris, France
- Occupations: Playwright, poet

Étienne-Auguste Dossion (9 August 1770 – 3 October 1832) was a French playwright and poet.

== Biography ==
The son of an extra dancer at the Paris Opera, Dossion was "one of these writers-actors who contributed to the formation of the song repertoire, and one of the most fruitful." He was successively a notary clerk, a prompter and a Harlequin at the Théâtre du Vaudeville, a master of studies at Collège Sainte-Barbe, a bridges inspector, an employee at the Interior Ministry under Corbière, dismissed through the influence of Godiche because he always threw him tobacco puffs and he smelled of eau de vie, a launderer at Vaugirard, before finishing a day laborer and dying at the Hôtel-Dieu.

== Works ==
- Arlequin Pygmalion ou La bague enchantée, one-act parade, mingled with comédie en vaudevilles, Paris, an II (1794), in-8°
- Romance sur la mort d’Agricole Viala
- La Mouche du coche, ou Monsieur Fait-Tout, comédy in 1 act and in prose, 1812, Paris, 1802, in-8°, with Georges Duval
- Couplets chantés à la section des Tuileries : le décadi 10 fructidor, l’an 2 de la République une & indivisible
- Recueil des couplets d’annonce chantés sur le théâtre du Vaudeville, depuis le 21 avril 1792... jusqu’au 1er vendémiaire an XII, Paris, Capelle, an XII
- Regrets d’un captif républicain français, d’être éloigné de sa patrie
- Ode à l’Etre suprême, music by Dalayrac
- À quelque chose malheur est bon, ou le Bien à côté du mal, Paris, Barba, 1807
- Épitre au poëte cordonnier, Paris, Aubry, 1808, in-8°, 8 p.; Paris, 1808, in-8°
- L’Éducation du fils d’Alcide, couplets sur la naissance du roi de Rome
- Chant des berceuses du Roi de Rome
- L’Élan du cœur. Opuscules à l’occasion du sacre de S. M. Charles X, 1825, in-8°
- Stances sur la mort de Louis XVIII
- Le Bordeaux, chanson bacchique (sic), pour le baptême de S. A. R. Mgr le Duc de Bordeaux
- Le Cri des employés. Réponse à MM. de La Bourdonnaye, Castelbajac, de Villèle, Cornet d’Incourt, Dufourgerais, etc., Paris, Delaunay, 1817
- Recueils des couplets d’annonces chantés sur le théâtre du Vaudeville; 1803, 1 vol. in-18
- Histoire vraisemblable, 1807, in-8°, under the pseudonym Bernard
- Guide du Constitutionnel, Paris, 1819, br. in-8°

== Sources ==
- Ferdinand Hoefer, Nouvelle Biographie générale, t.14, Paris, Firmin-Didot, 1855, (p. 666).
