= The Apotheosis of Voltaire =

1775 oil painting by Alexandre Duplessis

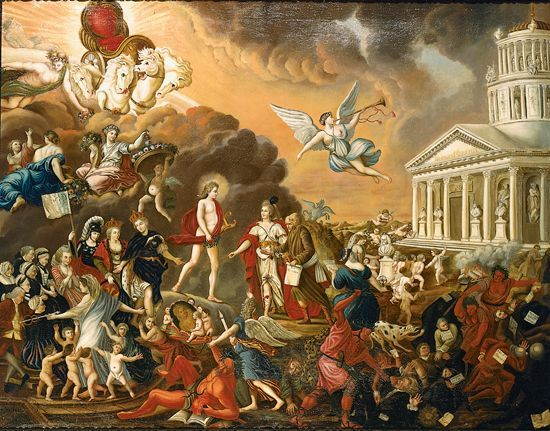
The Apotheosis of Voltaire led by Truth and crowned by Glory, Ferney version

The Apotheosis of Voltaire led by Truth and crowned by Glory (French: “l’Apothéose de Voltaire conduit par la Vérité et couronné par la Gloire”), also known as “The Triumph of Voltaire” (French: Le Triomphe de Voltaire) is a 1775 oil painting by Alexandre Duplessis.

A different painting by Robert-Guillaume Dardel in the Musée Carnavalet is also often known by this title. Both compositions were reproduced as prints, probably around the time that Voltaire's remains were transferred to the Paris Pantheon with great ceremony and huge crowds in 1791.

Apotheosis compositions had been popular in Western art since the Late Renaissance, celebrating both religious and secular figures, based on classical precedents. The term means the process of "becoming a god", though by the Baroque this was not intended literally. Nonetheless, there was a certain irony in painting such a subject to honour the famous sceptic Voltaire.

== Description ==
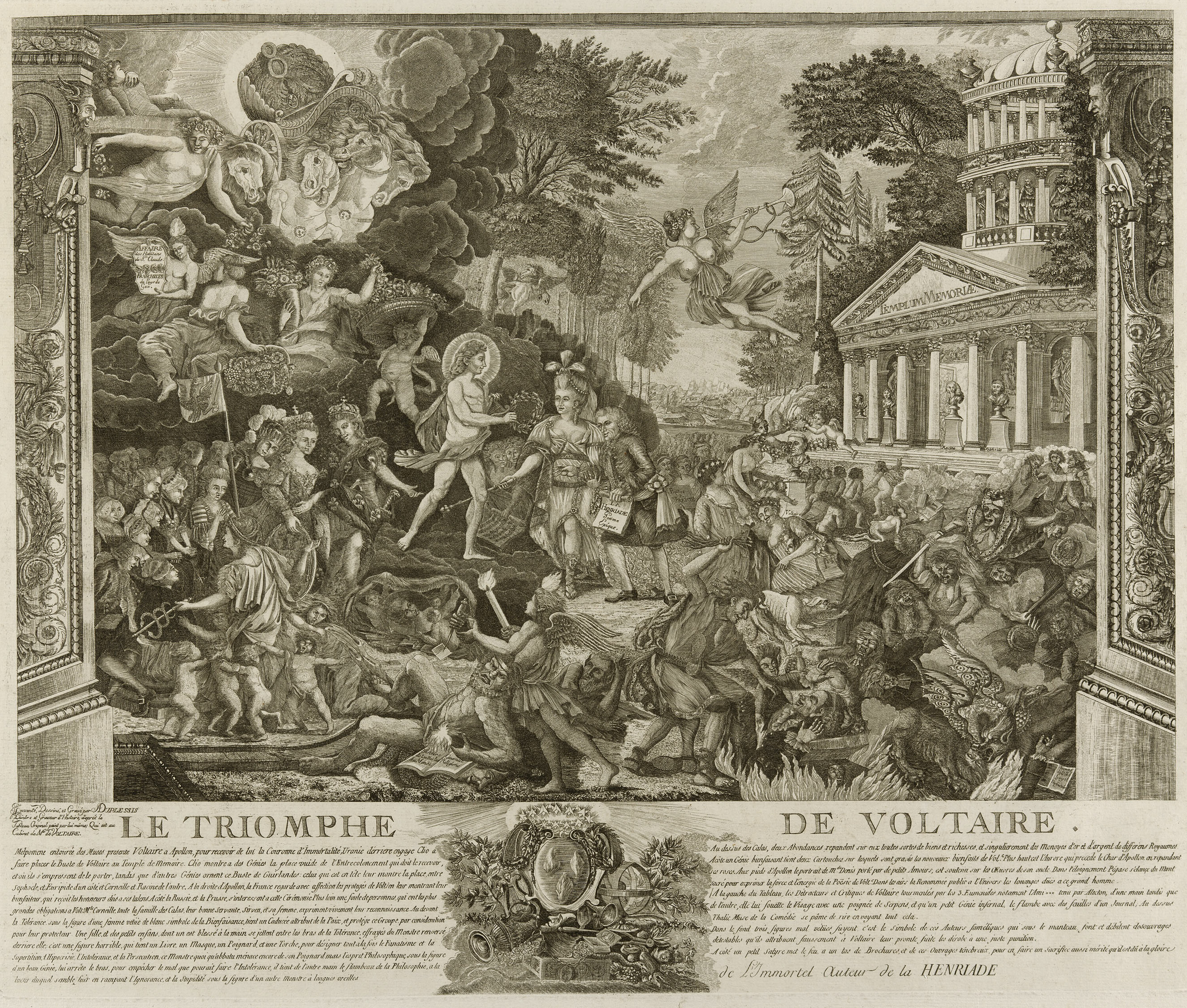
Version in etching by Alexandre Duplessis of the “Apotheose de Voltaire”, c. 1792

In the centre of Duplessis's painting, Melpomene muse of tragedy, leads Voltaire towards Apollo while behind the god, a putto holds up a waiting crown of immortality. Behind Voltaire, various critics and enemies are driven into hell while Thalia, muse of comedy, laughs in amusement. In the background another putti hangs a wreath over Voltaire's bust. Above Voltaire the chariot of Apollo, empty, approaches from across the sky. On the right stands the Temple of Memory with its central niche vacant, flanked by Sophocles and Euripides on one side with Corneille and Racine on the other. Many other details in the painting are described in twenty-three lines of commentary at the bottom of the print edition.

The artist, Alexandre Duplessis, an amateur who worked mainly in Lyon, approached Voltaire for permission to paint him. Although in his correspondence Voltaire compared him to Rubens, Madame de Genlis described the painting as a pub sign (“enseigne à bière”).

Voltaire owned the original painting, which is still in the collection at Ferney. Duplessis himself created several etchings of the painting, probably when Voltaire's remains were transferred to the Panthéon in 1791, or soon after.

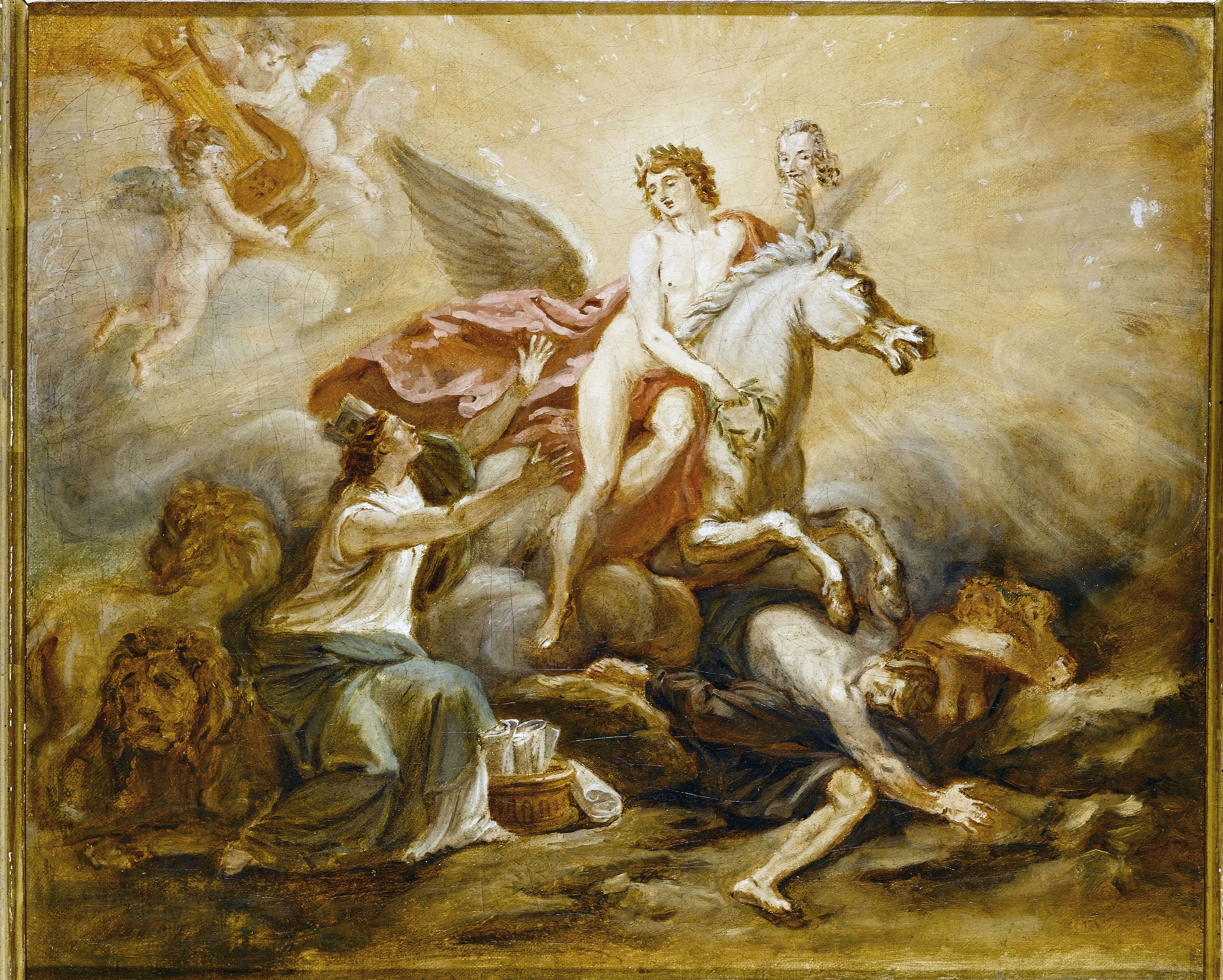
Dardel's painting, often given the same name, Musée Carnavalet

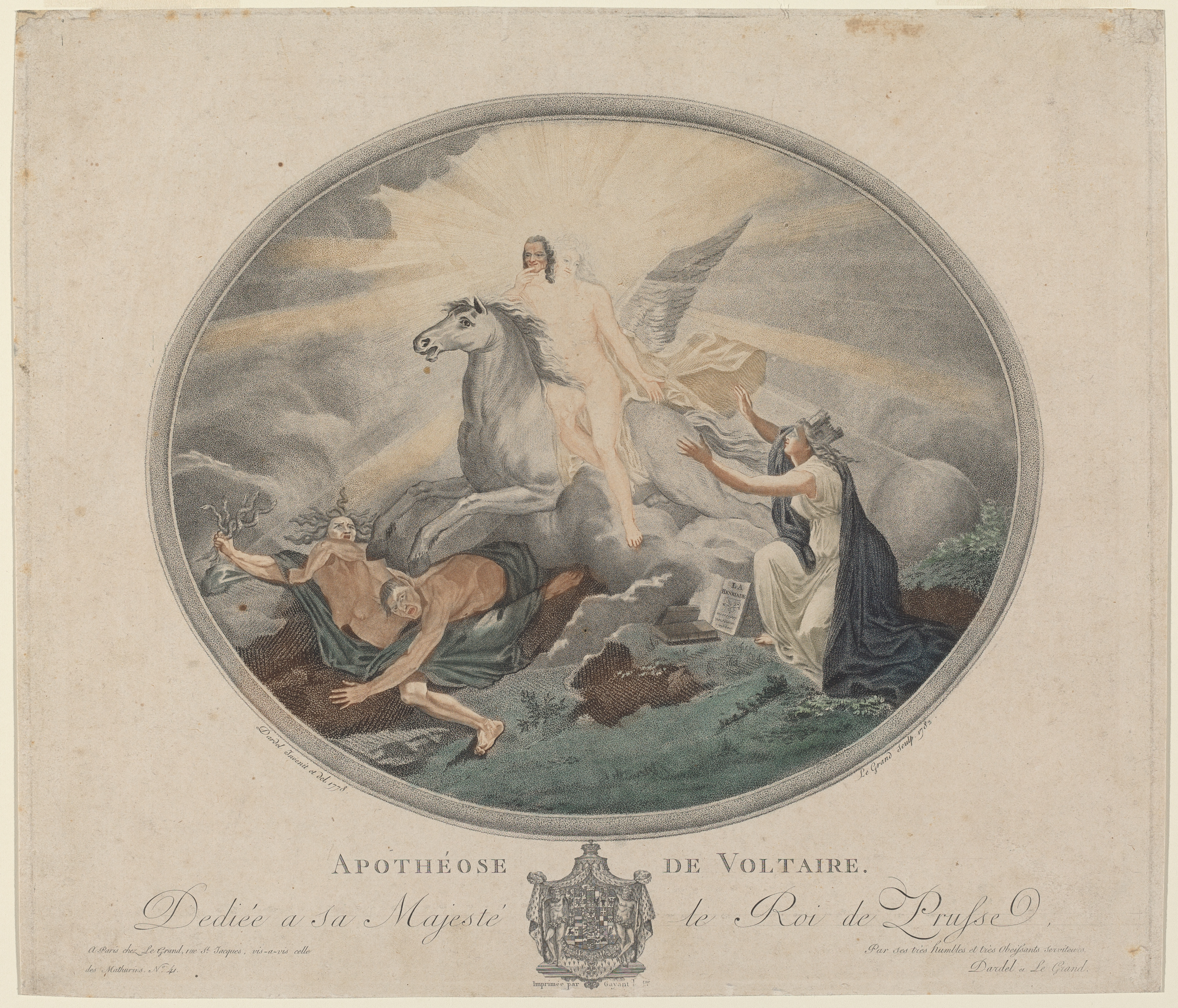
Pierre-François Legrand, after Robert-Guillaume Dardel, 1782

== Dardel ==
There is also a different painting now in the collection of the Musée Carnavalet by Robert-Guillaume Dardel which is known both as “Allegory to the glory of Voltaire” (French: Allégorie à la gloire de Voltaire) and as “The Apotheosis of Voltaire”. A figure astride a winged horse lifts off a mask with Voltaire's face to reveal himself as Apollo. Personifications of perhaps Ignorance and Envy fall back from the horse's hoofs, while a female figure, possibly Paris or Truth, reaches out to him on the other side.

This too was reproduced as a print, with slight variations, and the composition reversed, dedicated to the King of Prussia. A copy in the National Gallery of Art has watercolour washes.
