= Jacques Joseph Marie Decroix =

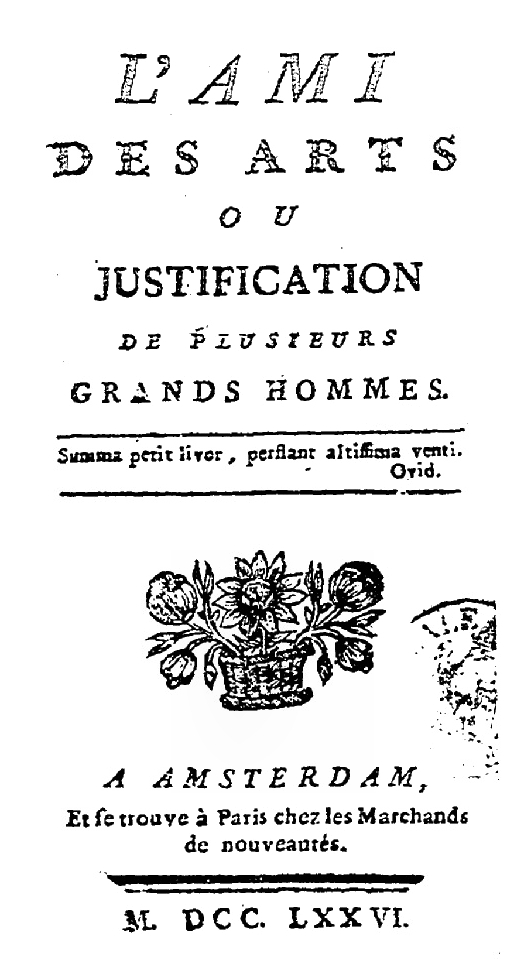
Title-page of his L'Ami des arts

Jacques Joseph Marie Decroix (15 March 1746, Lille – 28 June 1826, Lille) was a lawyer, man of letters, and collector. A great admirer of Rameau's music, he amassed a significant collection of handwritten scores and libretti. He also played a major editorial role in the publication of Voltaire's Œuvres complètes (Complete Works).

== Life ==
His father, Jacques-Marie Decroix, from a line of cloth merchants dating back to the 16th century, was a lawyer who became a prosecutor at the bureau des finances of Lille in French Flanders.

Jacques Joseph Marie appears to have studied in Paris. He was also a lawyer, receveur for the chapter of Saint-Pierre until 1784, trésorier de France at the bureau des finances in Lille from 1770 to 1776, then conseiller-secrétaire du roi in the chancery of Flanders. These positions brought him a comfortable income. His position as receveur at Saint-Pierre brought him 4,500 francs a year, he owned a house on the rue Royale of which a storm broke "two or three hundred panes", he had "farmers" and lost 10,000 livres invested, on the advice of Pierre-Augustin de Beaumarchais, in a "glassworks of a new kind".

Though critical of Louis XVI and an admirer of Emperor Joseph II's anti-clerical policies in the Netherlands, he seems to have been alarmed by the French Revolution.

== Voltaire ==
Passionate about Voltaire, Decroix played an important editorial role in preparing the Kehl edition of his Œuvres complètes. In 1775, he published a volume entitled L'Ami des arts, ou justification de plusieurs grands hommes (The Friend of the Arts, or Justification of Several Great Men) in which he argued for a better understanding of Voltaire through the restoration of the integrity of his work, including his correspondence. That same year, his childhood friend, the publisher Charles-Joseph Panckoucke, offered him the opportunity to collaborate on this project, which he had initiated. Decroix accepted, on the condition that he "remain completely unknown" and work under the direction of "a man of letters more capable of leading a literary undertaking of this magnitude". This would be Condorcet. In October 1777, Pancoucke and Decroix visited Voltaire at Ferney to present him with the plan for the edition prepared by Decroix and to obtain his approval for the publication of all his works, including those published anonymously or under a pseudonym. Voltaire accepted this plan, but it was later revised.

Decroix continued to gather scattered documents, letters and poems, to reread and annotate the proofs throughout the preparation of the Kehl edition, the last volume of which appeared in 1790. Until his death, he continued to gather texts and errata, and to collaborate on almost all of Voltaire's editions, in particular that of Beuchot, which began to appear in 1831, and for which he managed to obtain the documents in the possession of Wagnière, Voltaire's last secretary, who had refused them to Condorcet.

== Rameau ==
Laurence Decobert suggested that Decroix might have come to Rameau thanks to Voltaire. Certainly, Decroix compares their destinies in his Ami des arts, and places at the forefront of the "men of genius of the eighteenth century" those who had composed together the opera Samson, never performed because of censorship. His collection of Rameau material boasted around one hundred pieces. Its crowning achievements included a set of ten manuscripts of the principal operas, copied by Nicolas-Antoine Bergiron de Briou, as well as copies of Castor et Pollux, Les Fêtes d'Hébé, Le Temple de la Gloire, and Zoroastre, made by Pierre-Montan Berton. Decroix also personally copied unpublished pieces passed down by the composer's son, Claude-François Rameau, and later by his widow. His collection, a "jewel of the Music Department" and almost complete, was given to the Bibliothèque Royale (now the Bibliothèque nationale de France) in 1843 by his heirs.

== Published works ==
- Almanzor, tragédie. Rouen: Behourt. 1771. (Written with Antoine Vieillard de Boismartin)
- L'Ami des arts, ou Justification de plusieurs grands hommes. Amsterdam: n.p. 1776.
- La Mort de Voltaire, ode. [Paris]: Au Temple de la Gloire. 1780.
- "Rameau (Jean-Philippe)". Biographie universelle (Michaud) ancienne et moderne. Tome trente-cinquième. Paris: Desplaces. 1854. pp. 131–135.

== Reference ==
- Marchand, Jacqueline (March–April 1977). "Un Voltairien passionné: Jacques Joseph Marie Decroix (1746–1826)". Revue d'histoire littéraire de la France (in French). 77 (2): 187–205. JSTOR 40525789.
