= Charles, marquis de Villette =

French writer and politician

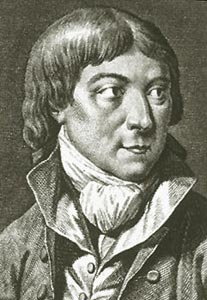
Charles Michel, was a French writer and politician.

Charles Michel, Marquis de Villette (4 December 1736 – 7 July 1793) was a French writer and politician.

== Life ==
=== Voltaire's protégé ===
Charles was born in Paris as the heir of a financier who left him a large fortune and the nobility title of Marquis. After taking part in the Seven Years' War, Villette returned in 1763 to his native city, where he owned an estate in Clermont. The Marquis made many enemies by his perceived lack of manners. Nonetheless, he succeeded in gaining the intimacy of Voltaire, who had known his mother and who wished to turn him into a poet; the aging philosophe is even recorded to have viewed his protégé Villette as "the French Tibullus".

In 1765, Voltaire invited the Marquis to his estate at Ferney. Although Voltaire joked quite freely about the Marquis' illegal attractions to men, he convinced the Marquis to marry Reine Philiberte de Varicourt in 1777. The marriage was unhappy, and his wife was subsequently adopted by Voltaire's niece, Marie Louise Mignot. Both Charles and Philiberte remained devoted to Voltaire, however, and it was at their home in Paris that Voltaire died in 1778. Villette kept Voltaire's heart in an urn.

=== Revolution ===
During the French Revolution, Villette publicly burned his lettres de noblesse, wrote revolutionary articles in the Chronique de Paris, and put forth the proposal that Louis XVI should be stripped of most power but maintained as head of state. In the rain of pamphlets which followed this advice, much was made of Villette's attraction to men. One pamphleteer vulgarized him as a man "unnatural" in all things. Another claimed that his own pamphlet, Les Enfants de Sodome à l'Assemblée Nationale, ou Députation de l'Ordre de la Manchette aux représentants de tous les ordres, actually came from the house of Villette, who was named as Grand Commander of an order of male lovers in this mocking call for gay rights. The attacks were answered on Villette's behalf by his illustrious friend, Anacharsis Cloots, a man hailed as "the Spokesman for the Human Race".

Villette was elected deputy to the National Convention by the département of Seine-et-Oise in 1792. He had the courage to condemn the September Massacres and to vote for the imprisonment only, and not for the death penalty, of Louis XVI (December 1792). He died in Paris the next year, and his seat in the Convention was taken by Antoine-Augustin Auger.

He was a critic of Robespierre especially his use of proscription lists. On 27 December 1792 there appeared in Chronique de Paris his warning of the "looming menace of dictatorship along with his concern at the inertness of Paris citizens if the face of brutal initimidation."

== Works ==
In 1784 he published his Œuvres, and in 1792 his articles in the Chronique de Paris appeared in book form under the title Lettres choisies sur les principaux événements de la Révolution.
