= Georges Duval =

French playwright

- Born: Georges-Louis-Jacques Labiche; 26 October 1772; Valognes, France
- Died: 21 May 1853 (aged 80); Paris, France
- Occupation: Playwright

Georges-Louis-Jacques Labiche (26 October 1772 – 21 May 1853), better known as Georges Duval, was an early 19th-century French playwright.

== Biography ==
Duval was originally expected to become a priest, but the French Revolution occurred when he was 17. Afterwards he joined a notary and began at the same time writing plays for small theaters. From 1805 to 1835, he was employed in public service as an office manager at the Interior Ministry, which left him time to devote to playwriting under the pen name Georges Duval. Working especially for small theaters, for which he wrote 70 plays, Duval composed a large number of Comédie en vaudevilles, including many in collaboration with Gouffé, Vieillard, Dumersan, Desaugiers, Dorvigny, Rochefort, Gaëtan, Dossion, P. G. A. Bonel, Servières, Thomas Tournay, Chazet and Rouel (from Caen). His Pièce qui n'en est pas une (1801) was a kind of parade that was played both in society salons and on stage, and has often been imitated since.

In a more serious genre, Duval published a Dictionnaire abrégé des mythologies de tous les peuples policés ou barbares, tant anciens que modernes, as well as his Souvenirs de la Terreur and Souvenirs thermidoriens, works in which he attacked the French Revolution.

== Works ==
=== Theatre ===
- 1798: Clément Marot, with Armand Gouffé, an VII;
- 1799: Vadé à la grenouillère, folie poissarde, with Armand Gouffé, an VIII;
- 1799: Garrick double, ou les acteurs anglais, with Armand Gouffé, an VIII;
- 1799: Piron à Beaune, with Armand Gouffé, an VIII;
- 1800: L’Auberge de Calais, with P. G. A. Bonel and Dorvigny, an IX;
- 1800: Midi, ou un coup d’œil sur l’an VIII, with Frédéric Gaëtan, an IX;
- 1800: Fagotin, ou l’espiègle de la l’isle Louvier, an IX;
- 1801: Le Val-de-Vire, ou le Berceau du vaudeville, with Armand Gouffé, an XI;
- 1801: Clémence Isaure, with Armand Gouffé, an XI;
- 1801: Philippe le Savoyard, ou l’origine des ponts-neufs, with René de Chazet and Gouffé;
- 1802: Parchemin, ou le greffier de Vaugirard;
- 1803: Jean Bart, with F. Ligier and Servière;
- 1804: L’Anguille de Melun;
- 1805: Jeanneton colère, with Servière;
- 1805: M. Vautour, ou le Propriétaire sous les scellés;
- 1805: Ildamor et Zuléma, ou l’étendard du prophète;
- 1805: La Pièce qui n’en est pas une, with P. G. A. Bonel and Servière;
- 1806: L’Auteur soi-disant, comedy in 1 act and in verse, given at théâtre de la Porte-Saint-Martin;
- 1806: Chapelle et Bachaumont, with Vieillard
- 1808: Le Retour au comptoir ou l’Éducation déplacée;
- 1809: Malherbe, with Vieillard;
- 1810: Monsieur Mouton, ou le déjeuner d’un marchand de laine, with Auguste Coster;
- 1812: Mon cousin Lalure, with Edmond Amelot;
- 1812: La Mouche du coche, ou Monsieur Fait-tout, with Dossion;
- 1814: Une Journée à Versailles, ou le Discret malgré lui, comedy in 3 acts and in prose, given at Théâtre de l'Odéon;
- 1815: La Soirée des Tuileries
- 1816: Le Chemin de Fontainebleau, with Rochefort;
- 1817: Werther ou les égarements d’un cœur sensible, with Rochefort, witty parody of the novel by Goethe;
- 1823: Les Cancans, ou les cousines à Manette, with Pierre Carmouche and Armand-François Jouslin de La Salle;
- 1824: La Pénélope de la cité, ou le Mentor de la jeunesse, with Rochefort and Jouslin de La Salle;
- 1826: Le Mari impromptu, ou la coutume anglaise, in 3 actes;
- 1827: Les Contrebandiers, ou le vieux gabelou, with Rochefort;
- 1830: L’Adjoint dans l’embarras, ou le pamphlet.

=== History ===
- Dictionnaire abrégé des mythologies de tous les peuples policés ou barbares, tant anciens que modernes, Paris, Barba, 1800, in-12;
- Souvenirs de la terreur de 1788 à 1793, Paris, Werdet, 1841-1842;
- Souvenirs thermidoriens, Paris, V. Magen, 1843.

=== Other ===
- Frédérick Lemaître et son temps, 1800-1876, Paris, Tresse, 1876.

=== Bibliography ===
- Édouard Frère, Manuel du bibliographie normand, t.1er, Rouen, A. Le Brument, 1858, (p. 416).
