= Antoine Vieillard de Boismartin =

French lawyer and playwright (1747–1815)

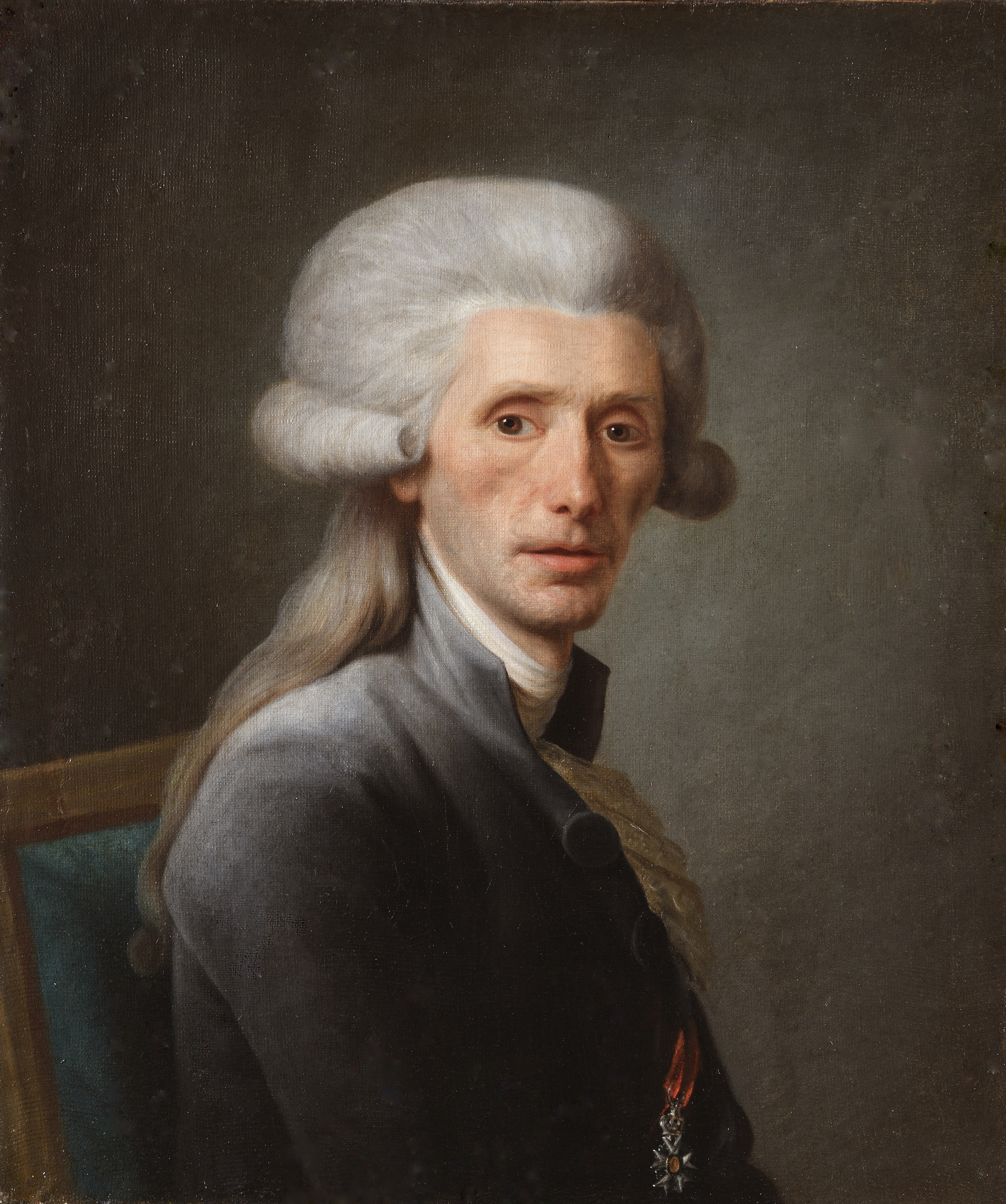

Antoine Vieillard de Boismartin (1747 – 13 January 1815) was a French lawyer and playwright. Before the French Revolution, Vieillard de Boismartin was a lawyer at parlement de Rouen. He later held several political and judicial positions, including three times mayor of Saint-Lô. The father of poet and critic Pierre-Ange Vieillard, Vieillard de Boismartin was a member of the Légion d’honneur.

== Publications ==
Theatre

- Almanzor, tragedy in five acts and in verse, with Jacques Joseph Marie Decroix, Rouen, Behourt, 1771, in-8°.
- Blanchard, ou le Siège de Rouen, tragedy in five acts and in verse, Rouen, 1777, in-8°, presented on stage, with large changes, at the end of 1792, and preinted again, Saint-Lô, P.-F. Gomont, 1793, in-8°.
- Théramène, ou Athènes sauvée, tragedy in five acts and in verse, Saint-Lô, P.F. Gomont, an v, in-8°.

Law

- Lettre écrite par un avocat, soldat citoyen, à ses enfants, au sujet de la révolution, Paris, Cailleau, 1789, in-8°.
- Mémoire justificatif pour Jacques Verdure père, Marie-Marguerite, Marie-Madeleine, Jacques Sénateur et Pierre Verdure, ses enfants, tous accusés de parricide et prisonniers ès prison de la conciergerie du Palais, Rouen, Pierre Seyer, 1787, in-8° de 144 p.

== Sources ==
- Joseph-Marie Quérard, La France littéraire, ou Dictionnaire bibliographique des savants, historiens et gens de lettres de la France, ainsi que des littérateurs étrangers qui ont écrit en français, plus particulièrement pendant les XVIIIe XIXe, t.10, Paris, Firmin Didot, 1839, p. 149.
