= Pierre-Ange Vieillard =

- Born: Pierre-Ange Vieillard de Boismartin; 17 June 1778; Rouen
- Died: 12 January 1862 (aged 83); Paris
- Occupations: Playwright; Librettist
- Spouse: Anaïs-Henriette Formey Saint-Louvent

Pierre-Ange Vieillard de Boismartin (17 June 1778 – 12 January 1862) was a 19th-century French poet, playwright and literary critic.

== Biography ==
Vieillard was the son of Antoine Vieillard de Boismartin, a lawyer at the Parlement of Rouen, then mayor of Saint-Lô, known for his beautiful and generous defense of the Verdure family (1780-1789), earning him the direct praise of Louis XVI, to whom he was introduced, and a kind of civic ovation in the midst of the National Constituent Assembly, during the session of January 30, 1790.

A payor at the Treasure (1806), Royal censor (1820-1824), director of the mayors' newspaper (1822-1824), literary critic by the Moniteur universel et officiel, director and chief curator of the bibliothèque de l'Arsenal, then librarian at the Senate in 1854, where he succeeded Paul-Mathieu Laurent, Vieillard began early in the dramatic career. He produced no less than 30 plays, 24 of which were presented in different theaters, such as the Opéra, the Opéra-Comique, the Théâtre-Français and the Théâtre du Vaudeville.

The verve he spent in these various works, where he worked with Armand Gouffé, Georges Duval, René de Chazet, Dumersan, Jules Merle and Joseph Pain, did not prevent him to exploit the literary criticism which asked for more seriousness and a more complete maturity of mind on his part. Vieillard published in several newspapers, mainly in the former Moniteur universel, many articles that reflected the breadth and variety of his knowledge.

He also became one of the principal editors of the Encyclopédie des gens du monde, where he was specially commissioned to write biographies about famous men of the French Revolution. Well versed in the history of that time, which he lived, the moderation of his opinions and the uprightness of his character let him naturally assess accurately the events and actors. Thus he could believe he was authorized to contribute the Le Moniteur Universel a series of studies on the Girondins by Lamartine, a work interrupted by the Revolution of 1848.

Vieillard also wrote about music; the last pamphlets he published in 1855 at the age of 78, Méhul, Madame Scio, Vicissitudes d’un librettiste de l’ancien opéra, were reproduced by le Ménestrel. Vieillard found musical themes in dramatic situations or legends. At various occasions, the Académie des beaux-arts asked him seven cantatas. One was performed at the session of the prize at the Institut in 1845. This time, the poet and the musician had drawn their inspirations in the ballad of Imogine, borrowed from the Monk by Matthew Gregory Lewis.

Vieillard married Anaïs-Henriette Formey Saint-Louvent (16 February 1802, Saint-Lô – 16 November 1873, Versailles) 29 March 1826. He was made a chevalier of the Order of The Lily in 1814 and of the ordre royal de la Légion d'honneur in 1815, and was also a member of the académies de Caen and Cherbourg.

Vieillard signed his works under different forms of his name or initials and the pen names Madame P.V. de L.B. et Jules.

== Main publications ==
Theatre

- 1800: Gilles ventriloque, one-act parade mingled with vaudevilles, with Nicolas Gersin and Antoine Année, Théâtre du Vaudeville, 5 March Text online
- 1800: Le Premier Homme du monde, ou la Création du sommeil, one-act folie-vaudeville, with Antoine Année, Theatre of the Opéra-Comique, 30 December
- 1802: Marmontel, one-act comedy, in prose, mingled with vaudevilles, with Tournay and Armand Gouffé, Vaudeville, 23 August
- 1803: Le Père d'occasion, one-act comedy, in prose, with Joseph Pain, Théâtre Louvois, 25 January
- 1805: Les Travestissements, comedy in 1 act and in prose, with Nicolas Gersin and Antoine Année, Louvois, 7 August
- 1806: Noir et blanc, arlequinade, in 1 act and in vaudevilles, with Théophile Marion Dumersan, Vaudeville, 24 May
- 1806: Brutal, ou Il vaut mieux tard que jamais, comédie en vaudeville in 1 act and in prose, parody of Uthal by Jacques Bins de Saint-Victor, with Joseph-Marie Pain, Vaudeville, 31 May
- 1806: Chapelle et Bachaumont, vaudeville anecdotique in 1 act, with Georges Duval, Montansier, 30 August
- 1808: Le Retour au comptoir, ou l'Éducation déplacée, one-act comédie en vaudeville, with Georges Duval, Vaudeville, 14 May
- 1809: Malherbe, one-act comedy, mingled with vaudevilles, with Georges Duval, Théâtre des Variétés, 27 May
- 1813: Les Rêveurs éveillés, parade magnétique in 1 act, mingled with vaudevilles, with Joseph-Marie Pain, Vaudeville, 30 January
- 1816: Le Mariage de Robert de France, ou l'Astrologie en défaut, one-act comedy in free verse, Théâtre-Français, 22 June

Varia

- 1802: La Boîte de Pandore et Vénus Callipyge, tales in verse Text online
- 1817: Poésies nationales
- 1819: Aux missionnaires de l'irréligion Text online
- 1827: Époques mémorables de la révolution et de la Restauration, mélanges en vers et en prose
- 1859: Souvenirs du théâtre. Méhul, sa vie et ses œuvres Text online

== Sources ==
- Ferdinand Natanael Staaff, La Littérature française depuis la formation de la langue jusqu'à nos jours, t. 2, Paris, Didier et Cie, 1878, (p. 1120-1122).
