= Pierre-Marin Rouph de Varicourt =

French Catholic priest (1755-1822)

- Bishop of Orléans
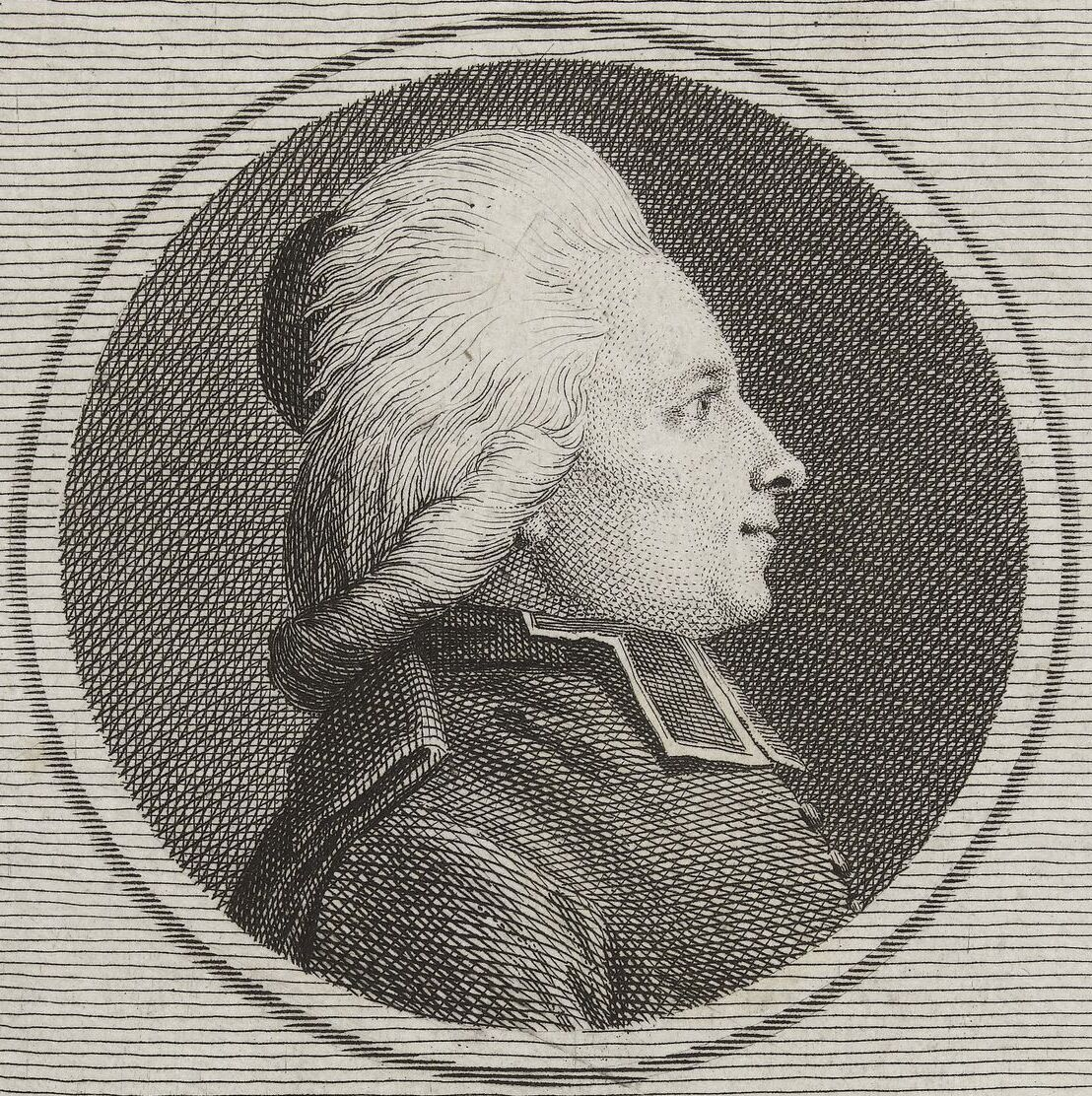
- Church: Catholic Church
- Diocese: Diocese of Orléans
- In office: 23 August 1819 – 9 December 1822
- Predecessor: Claude-Louis Rousseau
- Successor: Jean Brumauld de Beauregard

Orders
- Ordination: 19 December 1778
- Consecration: 12 December 1819 by Jean-Charles de Coucy

Personal details
- Born: 9 May 1755 Versonnex, Burgundy, Kingdom of France
- Died: 9 December 1822 (aged 67) Orléans, Loiret, Kingdom of France

Mgr Pierre-Marin Rouph de Varicourt (9 May 1755, Versonnex, Ain – 9 December 1822, Orléans) was a French Catholic priest, representing the clergy at the States-General, serving as a deputy to the 1789 Constituent Assembly and finally becoming bishop of Orléans.

== Life ==
Instead of following the traditional family military career, Rouph de Varicourt opted for a church career. He studied at the Saint-Sulpice seminary in Paris, headed by his relation Abbot Émery. At the end of his studies he obtained a canonate in the chapter in Geneva, whose bishop was living in Annecy. He had been the guardian of his nine siblings after their father's death (one of whom, Reine Philiberte de Varicourt, became an adoptive daughter of Voltaire), and his wish was to become the dean and parish priest of Gex.

In 1789 he was made a deputy for the clergy. A man of tradition, he refused to take the oath to the Civil Constitution of the Clergy and his benefice was suppressed. During the Reign of Terror he fled to the United Kingdom but was forced to return to the continent due to his poor health. He took refuge in Rolle on the boundary of his old diocese for seven months. On 9 Thermidor he thought he could at last re-assume his position in the parish at Gex, but was instead forced to flee, this time to Italy, where pope Pius VII spotted him and took him to Rome. It was only around 1800 that he returned to France, being named the priest of Gex on 20 August 1803. Made bishop of Orléans in 1817, he left Gex in 1819. He died in Orléans in 1822. Faithful to the Pays de Gex, he left a part of his property to Pougny and his birthplace of Versonnex after his death.

== Works ==
- Réflexions sur le remboursement des rentes foncières dues aux gens de mainmorte, 1789. OCLC 43290543

== Bibliography ==
- (in French) Sacri numeri : illustrissimo ac reverendissimo in Christi patri, DD. Petro M. Rouph de Varicourt, Aurelianensi episcopo, sedem suam ingredienti, in vigiliâ Epiphaniae Domini, anno 1820; Stephen T Badin; Orléans : Imprimerie de Jacob ..., 1820. OCLC 28600017
- (in French) Notice historique et biographique ou Éloge de mgr. Pierre-Marin Rouph de Varicourt, décédé évêque d'Orléans le 9 novembre 1822, et membre honoraire de la Société royale des sciences, belles-lettres et arts de cette ville Lu dans la séance publique du 29 aôut 1823; Charles Bon François Boscheron des Portes; Paris, chez Pillet et Colnet, 1823. OCLC 80601689
- The diary of Rouph de Varicourt, cure of Gex, deputy in the estates general of 1789.; M G Hutt; Bull. Inst. Hist. Res. Bulletin of the Institute of Historical Research. vol. XXIX. OCLC 50389786
