= Hélène de Gingins =

Swiss salonnière, abolitionist, and feminist

Madame Hélène de Gingins

Vice President of the International Abolitionist Federation
- In office 1891–1905

Personal details
- Born: Hélène Tronchin; 15 May 1828 Geneva, Switzerland
- Died: 23 July 1905 (aged 77) Geneva, Switzerland
- Spouse: Charles Wolfgang de Gingins
- Occupation: salonnière, abolitionist, feminist

Hélène de Gingins (née Tronchin; 15 May 1828 – 23 July 1905) was a Swiss salonnière, abolitionist, and feminist. She hosted political and religious salons in Geneva, and was active in promoting children's welfare and fighting to end prostitution. From 1891 to 1905, she served as the vice president of the International Abolitionist Federation.

== Biography ==
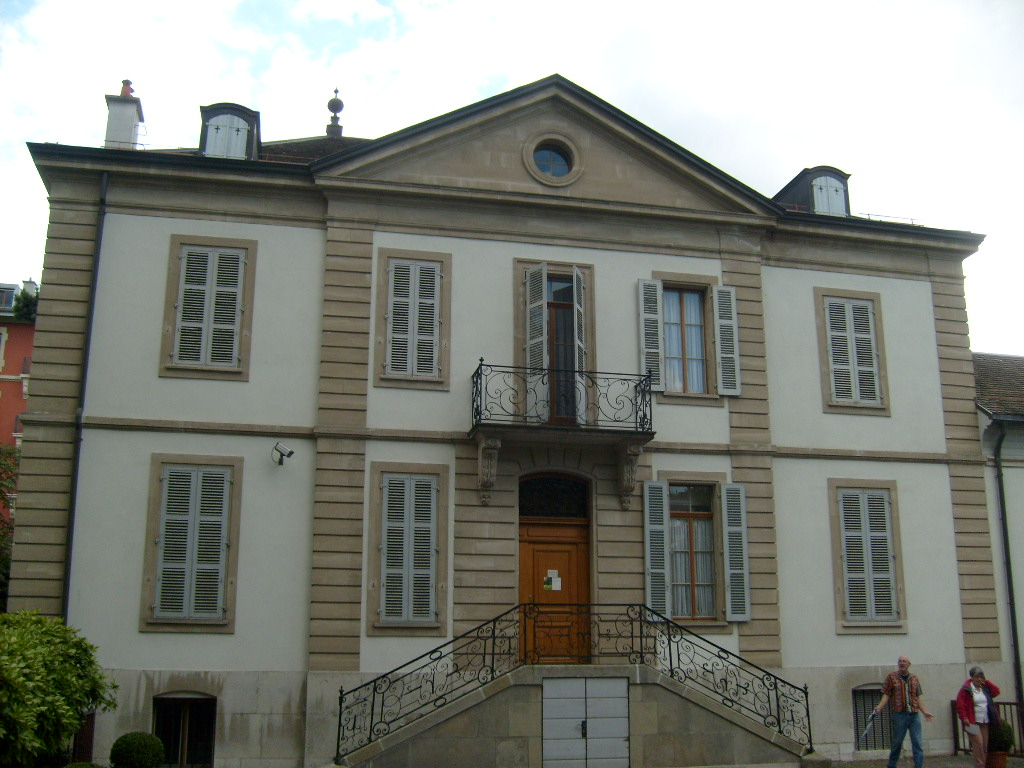
Les Délices, the Tronchin family home

Hélène Tronchin was born on 15 May 1828 in Geneva, the daughter of Colonel Armand Henri Louis Jacob Tronchin, a military officer and lay president of the Evangelical Society of Geneva. She grew up at Les Délices, her family's mansion that had previously been the home of Voltaire.

In 1848, she married the Swiss nobleman Charles Wolfgang de Gingins, Seigneur de Gingins. Her husband's family owned La Sarraz Castle.

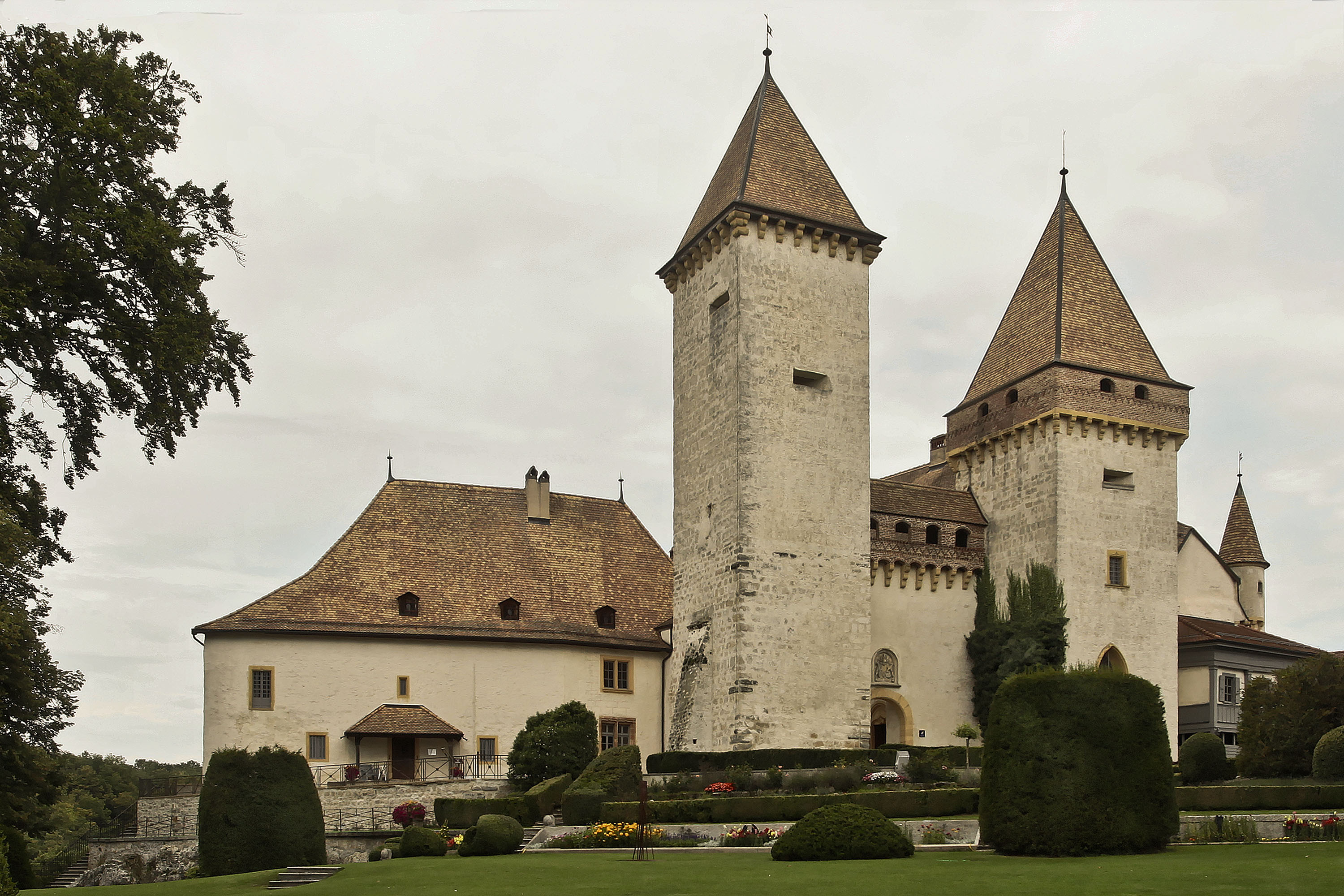
La Sarraz Castle, the de Gingins ancestral home

De Gingins became a salonnière, hosting political and religious salons in her home in Geneva. Through her salons, she was introduced to the English social reformer Josephine Butler, who convinced her to join the Comité intercantonal de dames in 1876. Through this organization, de Gingins worked to end female prostitution and promote children's welfare. Later, she joined the Association of Friends of the Young Girl and l'Association du sou pour le relèvement moral, which financed relief work. From 1891 to 1905, she served as vice president of the International Abolitionist Federation.

De Gingins died in Geneva on 23 July 1905.
