= Antoine-Augustin Auger =

French politician (1761–1836)

Antoine-Augustin Auger (8 May 1761 – 21 June 1836) was a French politician.

Born in Liancourt, Oise, he was elected an alternate member of the National Convention in 1792 after being administrator of the district of Chaumont - in effect he sat from 1793 onwards as the replacement for the dead marquis de Villette. He became secretary to the Convention in 1795 and was chosen by his colleagues on 4 brumaire that year to be a member of the Council of Five Hundred. He later entered the magistracy in which he would remain until the Bourbon Restoration.
