= Marie Louise Mignot =

French literary figure

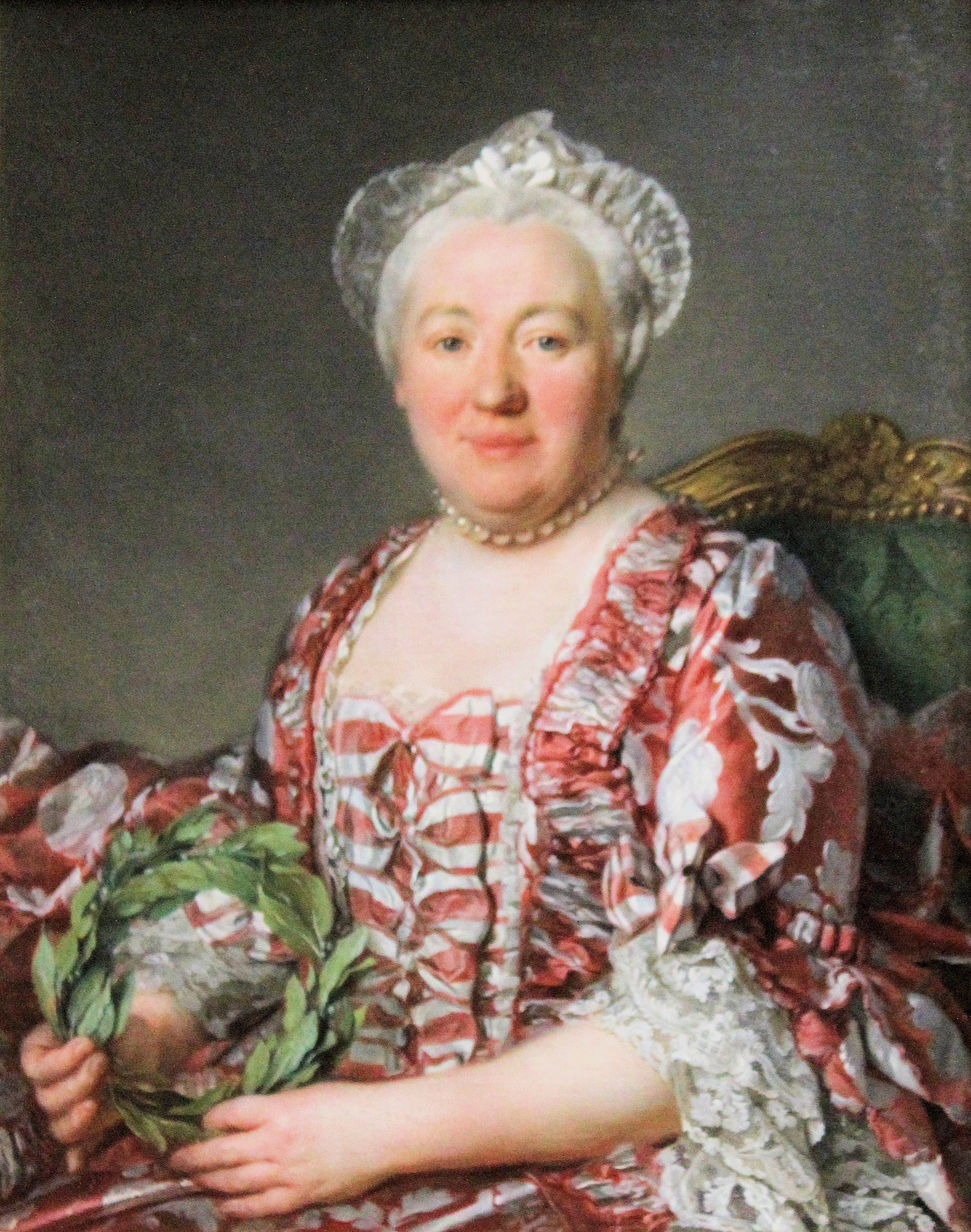
- Mme Denis by Joseph Duplessis
- Born: February 12, 1712; Paris, France
- Died: August 10, 1790 (aged 78); Paris, France
- Other names: Mme Denis, Mme du Vivier
- Known for: Voltaire's niece and companion of thirty years
- Spouse: Nicolas-Charles Denis

Marie Louise Mignot (English: /miːˈnjoʊ/ mee-NYOH, French: [maʁi lwiz miɲo]; February 12, 1712 – August 10, 1790) was a French literary figure. She was the daughter of Voltaire's sister, Catherine Arouet (1686–1726) and her husband Pierre-François Mignot (d. 1737). After the death of her widowed father in 1737, Voltaire provided her with a dowry and she married army supply officer Nicolas-Charles Denis, giving rise to her married name of Madame Denis. After her husband's premature death in 1744, she was taken in by her uncle Voltaire and became his housekeeper, hostess and companion. She also adopted his protégée Reine Philiberte de Varicourt when the latter's marriage to the Charles, marquis de Villette foundered on his homosexuality.

She did not follow Voltaire to the court of Frederick II of Prussia but moved with him to Les Délices in Geneva and then to Ferney, where they lived as a couple (though Voltaire was in love with her, they never married) until Voltaire's death in 1778, on which she inherited the majority of his estate. However, preferring Paris society, she sold off the château to move back to Paris.

== Sources ==
- visitvoltaire.com
