= Reine Philiberte de Varicourt =

French lady of letters

Reine Philiberte Rouph de Varicourt (1757–1822) was a French woman of letters. The sister of Pierre-Marin Rouph de Varicourt, she was spotted by Voltaire during his stay at Ferney – he made her his adoptive daughter, married her off to the Marquis de Villette (though the marriage proved unhappy, ending in her adoption by Voltaire's companion Marie Louise Mignot) and gained her entry to the literary world under the pseudonym "Belle et Bonne".
