= Les Délices =

Coordinates: 46.2076°N 6.1335°E

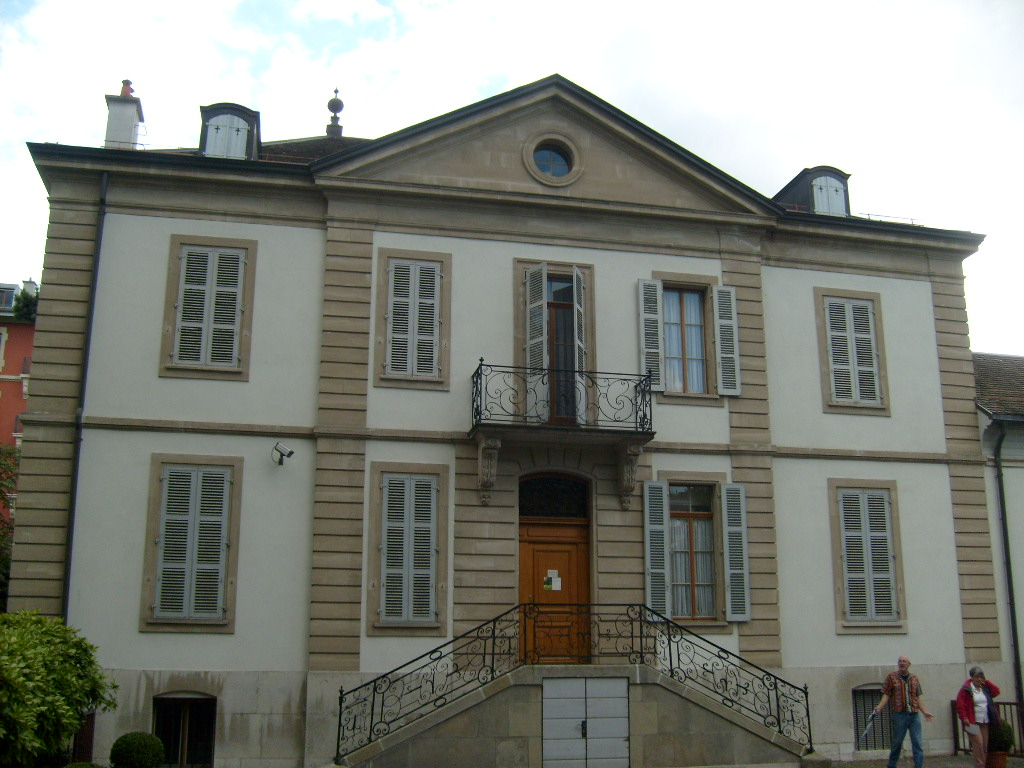
Voltaire Institute and Museum, Les Délices

Les Délices ("The Delights") was from 1755 to 1760 the home of the French philosopher Voltaire (1694–1778) in Geneva, Switzerland. Since 1952 it has housed the Institut et Musée Voltaire, a museum dedicated to his life and works.

== Voltaire's residency ==
Voltaire and his niece and lover, the widow Madame Marie-Louise Denis, were looking for a new home. A property in Geneva meant that they could live beyond the legal reach of the French crown, an important consideration for Voltaire who was constantly in trouble with the authorities in France because of his writings. Although no Catholic, even a severely lapsed one like Voltaire, could own land in Protestant Geneva, he could lease a property. Through the efforts of friends and business associates in Geneva, Voltaire was granted permission to live within the confines of the city.

Jean-Jacques Millet, a banker in Geneva, had a country residence on the hillside of Saint Jean just outside the city gates. It had a commanding view, gardens stretching down to the banks of the Rhône, and it came fully furnished. On January 19, 1755, Voltaire and Mme. Denis visited the property and were taken with it. They especially liked a long gallery that could be used to stage their theatricals (though theatre was forbidden in Geneva as immoral). On February 1, 1755, Voltaire received his permission to live in Geneva. A month later, on March 1, 1755, after a complicated series of negotiations (Voltaire drove a hard bargain), he and his niece moved into the property.

They set about immediately to improve what was already a superb residence. They planted many different kinds of plants and herbs, including asparagus (grown in a greenhouse), and many fruit trees, including apples and late-fruiting peaches. Four gardeners, twelve servants, and twenty artisans worked on the property. Voltaire and his paramour renamed the house "Les Délices", and he wrote a poem in 1758 about his feelings for the house:

Here I am, by reason drawn to this retreat,/At peace, at liberty,/Freedom, that wise divinity,/Whom all mortals desire, whose loss we all regret,/Is here the source of my felicity.[...]/Study sustains me, and reason guides me with its light;/I speak what I think, and I do as I will.

== After Voltaire ==
In 1760, Voltaire left Les Délices for Ferney in France, and the house was then occupied by the Tronchin family. It was the childhood home of Hélène Tronchin. In the 1830s, when Colonel Henri Tronchin (1794–1865) was a lay president of the recently founded Evangelical Society of Geneva, Les Délices is reported to have been used as a repository for Bibles. In view of Voltaire's skeptical attitude to Christianity and its Bible, this ironic report continues to be widely circulated and embellished by religious apologists. Contrary to popular belief, Les Délices has never been occupied by the current incarnation of the Geneva Bible Society, which was only founded in 1917.

The property was purchased by the city of Geneva in 1929, and today houses the Institut et Musée Voltaire, a museum founded in 1952 and dedicated to the life and works of Voltaire.

== Bibliography ==
- Borda d'Água, Flávio, and Jacob, François. A Short History of Les Délices: from the property of Saint-Jean to the Institut et Musée Voltaire. Geneva: La Baconnière/Arts et Bibliothèque de Geneve, 2013. ISBN 9782940462100.
- Davidson, Ian. Voltaire: A Life. New York: Pegasus Books, 2010, pp. 273–275.
- Pearson, Roger. Voltaire Almighty: A Life in Pursuit of Freedom. London and New York: Bloomsbury Publishing, 2005, pp. 241–246.
- Wootton, David, Candide and Related Texts. Indianapolis: Hackett Publishing Company, Inc. 2000.
