= Louis-Pierre-Pantaléon Resnier =

Louis-Pierre-Pantaléon Resnier (23 November 1759 in Paris where he died 8 October 1807) was a French playwright, literary critic and politician.

After he wrote two comedies in collaboration, he became assistant librarian at the Collège des Quatre-Nations. He then joined Le Moniteur universel where he wrote reports of theater and literary works to date. From 1795 to 1800, he served as guard of the deposit to the Ministry of Foreign Affairs. He was appointed senator in 1799 and promoted to the rank of Commandeur of the Légion d'honneur in 1804.

Resnier is buried at the Panthéon in Paris. A bust of him by Clodion, is housed at the château de Versailles.

== Theatre ==
- La Bonne femme, ou le Phénix, parodie d'Alceste, in 2 acts, in verse mingled with vaudevilles and dances, with Pierre-Antoine-Augustin de Piis, Jean-Baptiste-Denis Desprès and Pierre-Yves Barré, Comédiens italiens ordinaires du Roi, 7 July 1776
- L'Opéra de province, new parody of Armide, in 2 acts and in verse, mingled with vaudeville, with Pierre-Antoine-Augustin de Piis, Jean-Baptiste-Denis Desprès and Pierre-Yves Barré, Comédiens italiens ordinaires du roi, 17 December 1777

== Sources ==
- Pierre Larousse, Grand dictionnaire universel du XIXe, vol. 13, 1875, (p. 1034)
- "Louis-Pierre-Pantaléon Resnier", in Adolphe Robert and Gaston Cougny, Dictionnaire des parlementaires français (1789–1891), Bourloton, Paris, 1889 Edition details Wikisource
