= Censorship in the Ancien Régime =

Speech suppression in the Kingdom of France

Under the French Ancien Régime, royal censorship was the task of censors appointed by the chancellor to judge the editorial legitimacy of a manuscript and to authorize its publication by an approval they signed.

At the same time, a privilege in the form of letters patent granted in the King's Council, most often to the bookseller, guaranteed not the content, but the property of the publication against the counterfeiters. This renewable privilege was for three years, or even without limitation for certain basic works (Fathers of the Church, etc.).

Brochures of up to 48 pages in-12 were the subject of a simple permission granted by the lieutenant general of police of the place.

== Object of censorship ==
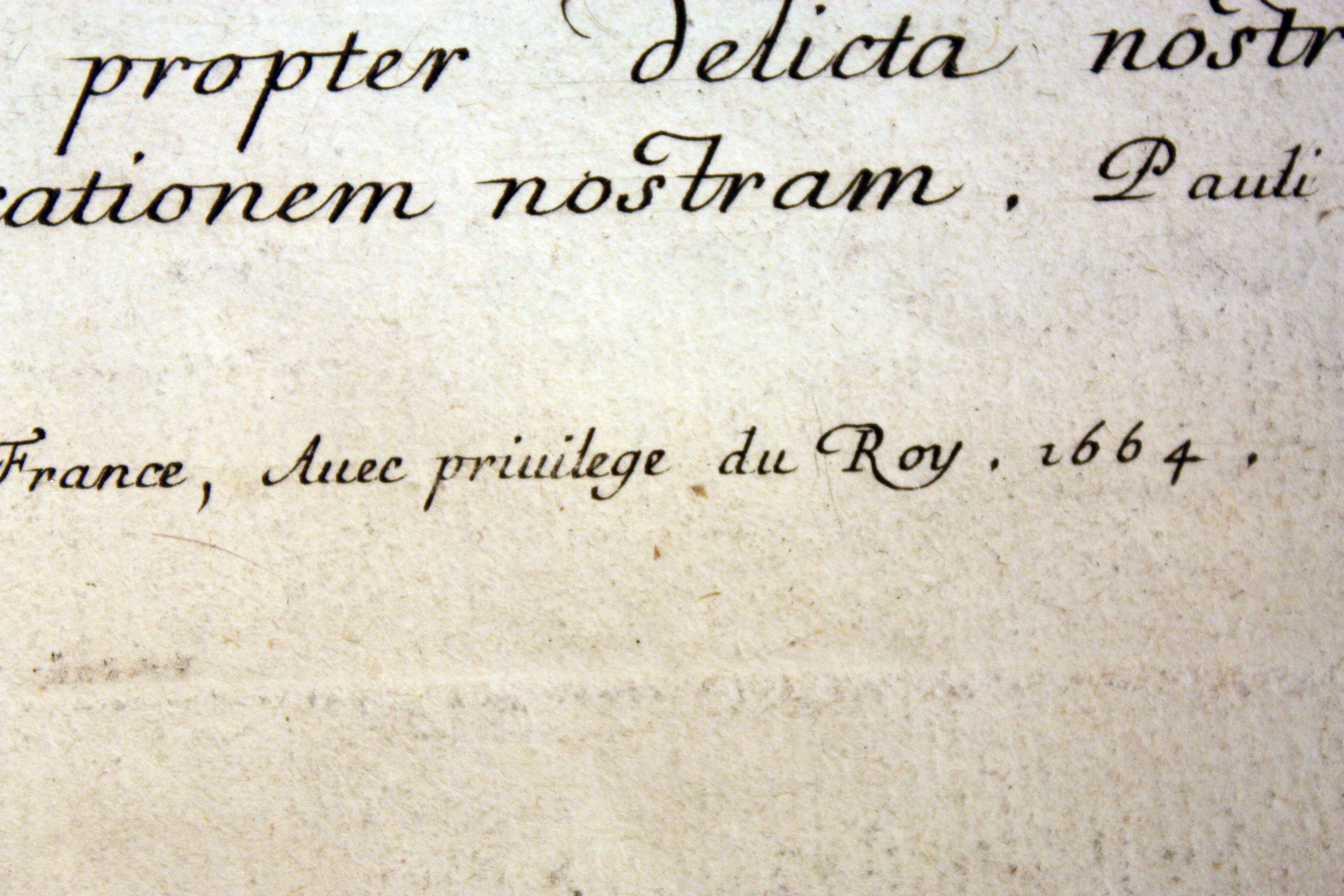
Royal Privilege affixed on an engraving of Gregoire Huret for the Theater of the Passion of Our Lord Jesus Christ

Censorship was provided by specialists in a number of areas, from the humanities to the sciences in general. They were appointed by the Chancellor. Their judgment related to the content of the proposed manuscript and not to the form. They could ask the author for some corrections.

== History of prior censorship ==
Richelieu was the first to appoint experts assigned to this task by the edict of 1629. After the Fronde, Colbert created a direction of the Bookstore, responsible for ensuring the granting of permissions and privileges now mandatory for all impressions made in France.

In 1701, Abbe Bignon, in charge of the bookstore business, promulgated a regulation of publishing in France which, modified in 1723 for Paris and generalized in 1744, remained in force until the French Revolution. Every manuscript must obtain the approval of a censor to obtain the publishing privilege. Some manuscripts were however published secretly under false address. This was the case of the Philosophical Letters of Voltaire or Émile, or On Education by Rousseau. But most authors wishing to avoid censorship were publishing their books abroad: London, Amsterdam, Frankfurt, Basel, Geneva. The regulation stipulated that books could cross the border only by certain cities and after examination. But there was no provision to suppress smuggling.

== Organization of censorship ==
The royal censors were appointed by the Chancellor, each in his specialty. The Royal Almanac published the list every year.

== Main royal censors ==
- Michel Adanson
- Nicolas Andry de Boisregard
- Charles de Beaumont, knight of Éon
- Pierre Jean Boudot
- Jean-Baptiste-Michel Bucquet
- Joseph Barthélemy-François Carrère
- Charles-Nicolas Cochin the Younger
- Nicolas Cocquelin
- Jean-Marie-Louis Coupé
- Louis Cousin
- Claude Delisle
- Jean-Nicolas Démeunier
- Desfontaines-Lavallée
- Bernard Le Bovier de Fontenelle
- Augustin François Jault
- Joseph Prunis
- Jean-Louis-Ignace de La Serre
- Guillaume-Chrétien de Lamoignon de Malesherbes
- Jean-Étienne Montucla
- Jean-Baptiste Robinet
- Antoine Yart

== Theatrical censorship ==
As early as 1701, the plays were in turn the subject of royal censorship: read before publication by the censors under the authority of the lieutenant general of police, the pieces were authorized either as such and received approval, or with cuts or corrections, when they were not simply prohibited. Voltaire paid the price for his Mohammed (1743), Sedaine for his The Deserter (1769); The Barber of Seville and The Marriage of Figaro by Beaumarchais escaped only thanks to the obstinacy of Marie Antoinette.

== Theatrical censors ==
- 1701-1721: Marc-René de Voyer, Marquis of Argenson (1652-1721)
- 1721-1726:?
- 1726-1734: Father Claude Cherrier (1655-1738)
- 1735-1762: Prosper Jolyot of Crebillon (1674-1762)
- 1762-1774: François-Louis Claude Marin 1721-1809)
- 1774-1776: Claude Prosper Jolyot of Crebillon (1707-1777)
- 1776-1777: Louis-Edme Billardon of Sauvigny (1736-1812)
- 1777-1790: Jean Baptiste Antoine Suard (1733-1817)
- 1790-1792: Joly3
- 1804-1815: Jean-Louis Brousse-Desfaucherets, Pierre-Edouard Lemonty, Charles de Lacretelle and Joseph-Alphonse Esmenard
- 1815-1822: Charles-Joseph Loeillard of Avrigny, Pierre-Edouard Lemontey, Charles de Lacretelle and Joseph-Alphonse Esmenard
- 1822-1827: Jacques Honoré de Lourdoueix, Charles de Lacretelle, René Alissan of Chazet, Jean-Louis Laya and Antoine Quatremère of Quincy
- 1827-1830:?

== See also ==
- Censorship in France
- Society in the Ancien Régime

== Sources ==
- Claude-Marin Saugrain, Code of the bookstore and printing of Paris, Paris, at the expense of the Community, 1744.
- Raymond Birn, The Royal Censorship of Books in Enlightenment France, Paris, Odile Jacob, 2007 (ISBN 2-7381-1851-8).
- William Hanley, A biographical dictionary of English censors 1742-1789, Ferney, International Center for the Study of the Eighteenth Century, 2005 (ISBN 978-2-84559031-1)
- Biography of the royal censors, Paris, at the merchants of novelties, 1821.
- Victor Hallays-Dabot, History of theatrical censorship in France, Paris, E. Dentu, 1862.
