= Coupe (disambiguation) =

Coupe or coupé is a car body style.

Coupe may also refer to:

- Champagne coupe, a stemmed glass
- "Coupe" (song), by Pop Smoke
- "Coupe", a song by Kris Wu from Antares
- "Coupé", a song by AJ Tracey from Flu Game
- La Coupe, a horse race in France

== People ==
- Coupe (surname)

== Transportation ==
- Coupé (carriage), a four-wheeled carriage
- Drophead coupé, a historical term for a convertible

=== Vehicle models ===
- Fiat Coupé, a coupé
- Hyundai Coupe, a sports car
- HSV Coupe, a coupé
- Aixam Coupé, a quadricycle
- Mini Coupé, a sport compact coupé
- Maserati Coupé, a grand tourer
- Mini Coupe, a kit aircraft
