= La Liberté des Nègres =

French abolitionist song

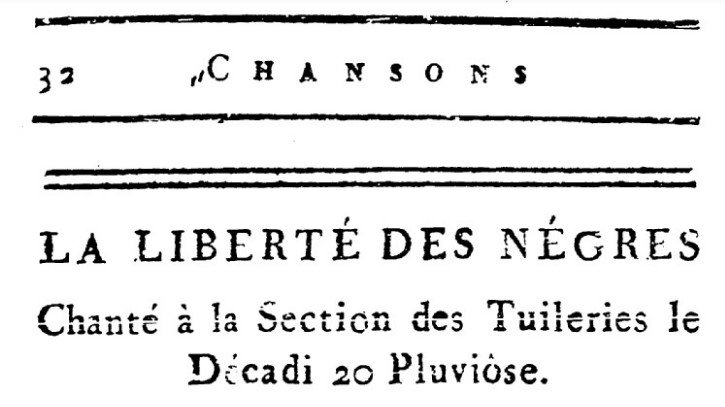

Song by Pierre-Antoine-Augustin de Piis
- Released: February 8, 1794
- Genre: Political song; Revolutionary song

La Liberté des Nègres (in English : The Freedom of the Negroes) is a French revolutionary song composed in 1794 by Pierre-Antoine-Augustin de Piis. It celebrates the abolition of slavery by the National Convention, under the Reign of Terror and the Mountain, by the Law of 4 February 1794. The song was published four days after the abolition of slavery. It is sometimes described as an anti-colonial song.

It is one of the first French abolitionist songs. It explores ideas such as the link between the slave trade and the Catholic Church, the union between Black and White people in the revolutionary struggles of the time, or a call for the liberation of all slaves in North America.

== History ==
=== Background ===
The colonial empire of the Kingdom of France extended over a significant part of the Caribbean, French Louisiana, and other territories in the Americas, such as Guyana. In this vast space, French merchants, with royal support, engaged in the triangular trade and transported millions of slaves to America. In Saint-Domingue alone, present-day Haiti, the number of slaves is estimated to be between 500,000 and 700,000, with a population of approximately 30,000 settlers and 40,000 free blacks, called "mulattoes", resulting in a ratio of about 15 slaves to one settler. Following the French Revolution, the constitutional monarchy attempted to maintain control over Saint-Domingue. Marked by a weakening of French authority due to turmoil in the metropolis, the constitutional monarchy granted more power to the settlers to organize the colony. This situation quickly deteriorated, leading to significant social conflicts in Saint-Domingue among the settlers, slaves, and "mulattoes". The Haitian Revolution then erupted in 1791, plunging the colony into war.

In response, the First Republic dispatched troops to the colonies to "restore order." In Saint-Domingue, they were led by Sonthonax, a revolutionary sent by the National Convention. Initially, he advocated for maintaining slavery in the colony, despite being a member of the Society of the Friends of the Blacks. However, he faced a highly complicated situation on the ground, with challenging terrain and an asymmetric war ravaging the colony. Additionally, he alienated a portion of the settlers who largely rejected his views on freedom and the treatment of slaves. Consequently, Sonthonax declared that the colonists were mainly motivated by "racial hatred" and took measures to exile, imprison, and even execute some of them. Faced with this situation, he sought support from other factions to continue the war and decided to ally with the "mulattoes" to regain control of the colony. In August 1793, he enacted the abolition of slavery in the Northern province of Saint-Domingue, but the former slaves remained subject to certain conditions.

News of these events reached Paris swiftly, where the leading political factions of the Reign of Terror were still deliberating on their stance toward the abolition of slavery. Some prominent figures of the young Republic, such as Maximilien Robespierre, had relatively changing positions. However, in 1794, Robespierre, along with a significant portion of the Jacobins, including his adversaries Danton and Camille Desmoulins, supported the decree of abolition of slavery on February 4, 1794. This marked the first abolition of slavery in history.

=== Composition and first representation ===
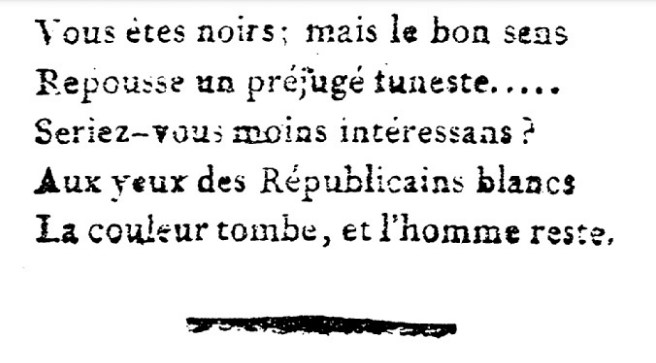
Last verses of the song

The song was composed in this context by Pierre-Antoine-Augustin de Piis, nicknamed "citizen Piis." He was the son of a settler in Saint-Domingue, and he quickly joined abolitionist circles in the métropole and produced various vaudevilles. He adapted the music from François Devienne's "Les Visitandines," a famous flutist of the period.

Piis then performed publicly the song on February 8, 1794, at the Revolutionary Section of the Tuileries, four days after the decree of the National Convention.

The same year, another French abolitionist song was published, dealing with a similar theme, titled "Couplets pour la Liberté des Nègres" by Royer.

=== Analysis ===
This adaptation was not incidental, as "Les Visitandines" is a revolutionary work directed against the Catholic Church and the practice of selling nuns, where families would sell their daughters to convents to earn money. The specific reused musical section is linked to a verse in François Devienne's work that declares, "daignez m'épargner le reste" ("deign to spare me the rest"), explicitly connected by Piis to the theme of slavery. The song is considered to be Piis' most personal.

Thus, he compared the economic reasons for forced monasticism and the economic reasons for slavery. He also highlighted, through this same method, the role of the Catholic Church in the slave trade. The text is also interesting as it extended the fight for the freedom of Blacks to North America and did not remain confined to the situation in Saint-Domingue. Piis describes an idyllic vision where the Blacks from the colonies would assist the White French in the métropole in their revolution, and vice versa. By this process, he establishes a connection between the Haitian and French Revolutions, linking and supporting both. Some researchers described the song as a decolonial song.

However, despite the strong abolitionist and anti-racist nature of the text, it remained marked by certain biases of the author, such as an infantilizing vision of Black people.

== Legacy ==
=== Art ===
The Encyclopædia Universalis considers that it is 'perhaps the most beautiful French song of the period'. The song was used by France Info in a program commemorating the victims of slavery and by France Culture in one dedicated to the abolition of 1794.

=== Research and comments ===
The Dijon Academy produced in 2009 an in-depth analysis of the song.

== Text ==
The text given is the text of the edition of Chansons patriotiques : chantées, tant à la section des Tuileries, que sur le théâtre du Vaudeville from Piis.

1. Le savez-vous, républicains,
Quel était le sort de ce nègre
Qu’à son rang, parmi les humains,
Un décret sage réintègre ?
Il était esclave en naissant,
Puni de mort pour un seul geste…
On vendait jusqu’à son enfant…
Le sucre était teint de son sang…
Ah ! daignez m’épargner le reste… (bis)

2. De vrais bourreaux, altérés d’or,
Promettant d’alléger ses chaînes,
Faisaient, pour les serrer encor
Des tentatives inhumaines.
Mais contre leurs complots pervers,
C'est la Nature qui proteste;
Et deux Peuples brisant leurs fers
Ont, malgré la distance des mers,
Fini par s'entendre de reste.

3. Quand ils ont de leurs pouvoirs
Donné la preuve indubitable,
Qu’ont dit les députés des noirs
À notre sénat respectable ?
« Nous n’avons plus de poudre, hélas !
Mais nous brûlons d’un feu céleste :
Aidez nos trois cents mille bras
À conserver dans nos climats
Un bien plus cher que tous le reste. »(bis)

4. Soudain, à l’unanimité :
« Déclarez à nos colonies,
Qu’au désir de l’humanité
Elles sont par vous affranchies.
Et si des peuples oppresseurs,
Contre un tel vœu se manifestent;
Pour amis et pour défenseurs,
Enfin, pour colons de nos cœurs,
Songez que les Français vous restent. »

5. Ces Romains, jadis si fameux,
Ont été bien puissans, bien braves;
Mais ces Romains. libres chez eux,
Conservaient au loin des esclaves.
C‘est une affreuse vérité,
Que leur histoire nous atteste;
Puisqu’avec nous d’humanité,
Déjà les Romains sont en reste.

6. Tendez vos arcs, négres marrons,
Nous portons la flamme à nos méches
Comme elle part de nos canons;
Que la mort vole avec vos flèches.
Si des royalistes impurs
Chez nous, chez vous portent la peste,
Vous dans vos bois, nous dans nos murs,
Cernons ces ennemis obscurs,
Et nous en détruirons le reste.

7. Quand dans votre sol échauffé,
Il leur a semblé bon de naître,
La canne à sucre et le café
N’ont choisi ni gérant, ni maître.
Cette mine est dans votre champ,
Nul aujourd’hui ne le conteste,
Plus vous peinez en l’exploitant,
Plus il est juste, assurément,
Que le produit net vous en reste.

8. Doux plaisir de maternité,
Devenir plus cher à négresse,
Et sans nuire à fécondité,
Un caractère de sagesse :
Zizi toi n’étais, sur ma foi,
Trop fidèle, ni trop modeste;
Mais toi t’en feras double loi,
Si petite famille à toi
Dans caze à toi, près de toi reste....

9. Américains, l’égalité
Vous proclame aujourd’hui nos frères :
Vous aviez à la liberté
Les mêmes droits héréditaires :
Vous êtes noirs, mais le bon sens
Repousse un préjugé funeste :
Seriez-vous moins intéressans ?
Aux yeux des républicains blancs

La couleur tombe et l’homme reste.

1. Do you know, Republicans,
What fate was the fate of the negro?
By a wise decree among humans,
Reinstated to his status;
He was a slave from birth!
Punished with death for a single gesture…
Even his child was sold…
The sugar was dyed with his blood…
Deign to spare me the rest.

2. True executioners, altered by gold,
Promising to lighten his chains,
Made, to tighten them even more,
Inhumane attempts.
But against their perverse plots,
Nature protests;
And two Peoples breaking their chains,
Despite the distance of the seas,
Finally came to an understanding.

3. What did the representatives of the blacks say
To our respectable Senate,
When they had, with their powers,
Given undeniable proof:
"We have no more powder, alas!
But we burn with a heavenly fire,
Help our three hundred thousand arms
To preserve in our climates
A possession dearer than all the rest."

4. Suddenly, unanimously:
"Declare to our colonies,
That, according to the desire of humanity,
They are freed by you.
And if oppressive peoples,
Manifest against such a wish;
As friends and defenders,
Finally, as settlers of our hearts,
Consider that the French remain with you."

5. These Romans, once so famous,
Were very powerful, very brave;
But these Romans, free at home,
Preserved slaves from afar.
It's a dreadful truth,
As their history attests;
Since, in terms of humanity,
The Romans are already behind us.

6. String your bows, marooned negroes,
We carry the flame to our fuses
As it departs from our cannons;
Let death fly with your arrows.
If impure royalists
Spread the plague among us, among you,
You in your woods, we in our walls,
Let's surround these obscure enemies,
And we will destroy the rest.

7. When in your heated soil,
It pleased them to be born,
The sugar cane and coffee
Chose neither manager nor master.
This mine is in your field,
No one today disputes it,
The more you toil in exploiting it,
The more just it is, undoubtedly,
That the net product remains with you.

8. Sweet pleasure of maternity,
Becoming dearer to the negress
And without harming fertility,
Taking on a tint of wisdom.
Zizi, you were not, on my faith,
Too faithful or too modest;
But you will make it a double law,
If a small family of yours
Stays in your house, near you.

9. Americans, equality
Proclaims you today our brothers,
To Liberty, you had
The same hereditary rights.
You are black, but common sense
Rejects a fatal prejudice...
Would you be less interesting,
In the eyes of white Republicans,

Color falls away, and the person remains.
