= Desfontaines-Lavallée =

French writer and playwright (1733–1825)

François-Georges Fouques Deshayes (1733, Caen – 20 November 1825), known as Desfontaines or Desfontaines-Lavallée, was a French writer and playwright.

Before the French Revolution he worked as a royal censor, secretary and librarian. He cooperated in the publication of the Nouvelle Bibliothèque des romans (New Library of Novels) and wrote several novels himself, including Lettres de Sophie et du chevalier de *** (1765).

He was one of the founders of the Dîners du Vaudeville and of the Dîners du Caveau. He died in Paris.

== Works ==
Theatre

- 1765: La Bergère des Alpes, comedy in 1 act and in free vers, Hôtel de Bourgogne, 15 December
- 1767: L'Aveugle de Palmyre, comédie pastorale in 2 acts in verse mingled with ariettes, Hôtel de Bourgogne, 5 March Read online
- 1771: La Cinquantaine, pastorale in 3 acts, music by Laborde, Théâtre du Palais-Royal, 13 Août Read online
- 1773: Isménor, heroic drama in 3 acts, music by Rodolphe, Château de Versailles, 17 November
- 1776: Le Mai, comedy in 3 acts, mingled with verse and prose, ariettes and vaudevilles and ending with a ballet, Hôtel de Bourgogne, 8 May
- 1778: La Chasse, comedy in 3 acts and in prose, mingled with ariettes, Hôtel de Bourgogne, 12 October
- 1780: L'amant anonyme, opéra comique in 2 acts with music by Joseph Bologne, Chevalier de Saint-Georges, 8 March
- 1781: L'Amant statue, opéra comique in vaudevilles in 1 act, Hôtel de Bourgogne, 20 February
- 1781: Isabelle hussard, parade in 1 act and in vaudevilles, Hôtel de Bourgogne, 31 July
- 1782: L'Amour et la Folie, opera comique in 3 acts, in vaudevilles and in prose, Hôtel de Bourgogne, 5 March
- 1783: Les Trois inconnues, comedy in 3 acts and in verse mingled with ariettes, Château de Versailles, 7 February
- 1783: Le Réveil de Thalie, comedy in 3 acts, Comédie Italienne, 6 May
- 1783: La Dot, comedy in 3 acts and in prose, Hôtel de Bourgogne, 8 November
- 1784: Les Amours de Chérubin, comedy in 3 acts and in prose, mingled with music and vaudevilles, Hôtel de Bourgogne, 4 November
- 1785: L'Amant statue, comedy in 1 act and in prose mingled with ariettes, with music by Nicolas Dalayrac, salle Favart, created 4 August
- 1785: La Dot, comedy in 3 acts and in prose mingled with ariettes, music by Nicolas Dalayrac, salle Favart, created 8 November at the Cour in Fontainebleau then given 21 November
- 1786: L'Incendie du Havre, historical fact in one act, prose and vaudevilles, Hôtel de Bourgogne, 21 February
- 1788: Fanchette ou l'Heureuse Épreuve, comedy in 3 acts and in prose mingled with ariettes, music by Nicolas Dalayrac, salle Favart, 13 October
- 1790: Le District de village, ambigu in 1 act, Hôtel de Bourgogne, 15 March Read online
- 1790: Vert-Vert, divertissement in 1 act, music by Nicolas Dalayrac, salle Favart, created 11 October
- 1792: Les Mille et un théâtres, opera comique in 1 act and in vaudevilles, Théâtre du Vaudeville, 14 February
- 1792: Arlequin afficheur, comédie-parade in 1 act, in prose mingled with vaudeville, with Pierre-Yves Barré and Jean-Baptiste Radet, Théâtre du Vaudeville, 9 April
- 1792: Le Projet manqué, ou Arlequin taquin, parody of Lucretius, in 1 act, in prose and in vaudevilles, with Pierre-Yves Barré and Jean-Baptiste Radet, Théâtre du Vaudeville, 18 May
- 1792: Arlequin Cruello, parody of Othello by Jean-François Ducis, in 2 acts and in prose, mingled with vaudevilles, with Pierre-Yves Barré and Jean-Baptiste Radet, Théâtre du Vaudeville, 13 December
- 1793: La Chaste Suzanne, play in 2 acts, with Pierre-Yves Barré and Jean-Baptiste Radet, Palais de l'Égalité, 5 January
- 1793: Colombine mannequin, comédie-parade in 1 act, in prose, mingled with vaudevilles, with Pierre-Yves Barré and Jean-Baptiste Radet, Théâtre du Vaudeville, 15 February
- 1793: Le Divorce, comedy in 1 act and in vaudeville, Théâtre du Vaudeville, 18 May Read online
- 1793: Au retour, historic and patriotic fact in 1 act and in vaudevilles, with Jean-Baptiste Radet, Théâtre du Vaudeville, 4 November
- 1794: La Fête de l'égalité, comedy in 1 act, with Jean-Baptiste Radet, Théâtre du Vaudeville, 25 February Read online
- 1794: Les Vieux époux, comedy in 1 act, mingled with vaudevilles, Théâtre du Vaudeville, 24 March
- 1796: Encore un curé, historic and patriotic fact in 1 act and in vaudevilles, with Jean-Baptiste Radet, Théâtre du Vaudeville, 20 November Read online
- 1794: Les Chouans de Vitré, historical fact in 1 act, in prose, Théâtre du Vaudeville, 12 June
- 1794: La Fille soldat, historical fact in 1 act and vaudevilles, Théâtre du Vaudeville, 13 December
- 1795: Abuzar, ou La Famille extravagante, parody of Abufar, ou la Famille arabe, in 1 act and in vaudevilles, with Pierre-Yves Barré and Jean-Baptiste Radet, Théâtre du Vaudeville, 15 May Read online
- 1797: Le Mariage de Scarron, comedy in 1 act and in prose, mingled with vaudevilles, with Pierre-Yves Barré and Jean-Baptiste Radet, Théâtre du Vaudeville, 8 May
- 1797: Le Pari, divertissement in 1 act, in prose and vaudevilles, on the occasion of peace, with Pierre-Yves Barré, Jean-Baptiste Radet, Jacques-Marie Deschamps and Jean-Baptiste-Denis Desprès, Théâtre du Vaudeville, 28 October Read online
- 1798: Jean-Jacques Rousseau dans son ermitage, ou la Vallée de Montmorency, comédie en vaudeville in 3 acts, with Pierre-Yves Barré, Jean-Baptiste Radet and Pierre-Antoine-Augustin de Piis, Théâtre du Vaudeville, 1 June
- 1798: Hommage du petit Vaudeville au grand Racine, comédie en vaudeville in 1 act, with Pierre-Yves Barré, Jean-Baptiste Radet, André-François de Coupigny and Pierre-Antoine-Augustin de Piis, Théâtre du Vaudeville, 21 May
- 1799: Voltaire, ou Une journée de Ferney, comedy in 2 acts, mingled with vaudevilles, with Pierre-Yves Barré, Jean-Baptiste Radet, André-François de Coupigny and Pierre-Antoine-Augustin de Piis, Théâtre du Vaudeville, 19 February
- 1799: Monet directeur de l'Opéra-comique, comedy in 1 act and in vaudevilles, with Pierre-Yves Barré and Jean-Baptiste Radet, Théâtre du Vaudeville, 22 July
- 1799: La Girouette de Saint-Cloud, impromptu in 1 act, in prose, mingled with vaudevilles, with Pierre-Yves Barré, Jean-Baptiste Radet, Emmanuel Dupaty and Bourgueil, Théâtre du Vaudeville, 14 November
- 1799: Cendrillon, ou l'École des mères, comedy in 2 acts, Théâtre du Vaudeville
- 1800: M. Guillaume, ou le Voyageur inconnu, comedy in 1 act and in prose mingled with vaudevilles, with Pierre-Yves Barré, Jean-Baptiste Radet and Bourgueil, Théâtre du Vaudeville, 1 February
- 1800: Gessner, comedy in 2 acts and in prose, mingled with vaudevilles, with Pierre-Yves Barré, Jean-Baptiste Radet and Bourgueil, Théâtre du Vaudeville, 31 May
- 1800: La Récréation du monde, suite de la Création, melodrama, music by Joseph Haydn, mingled with vaudevilles, with Pierre-Yves Barré and Jean-Baptiste Radet, Théâtre du Vaudeville, 29 December
- 1801: Enfin nous y voilà, divertissement in 1 act, with Pierre-Yves Barré and Jean-Baptiste Radet, Théâtre du Vaudeville, 18 February
- 1802: La Tragédie au Vaudeville, in 1 act and in prose, mingled with couplets, followed by Après la confession, la pénitence, petit épilogue à l'occasion d'un grand prologue, with Pierre-Yves Barré and Jean-Baptiste Radet, Théâtre du Vaudeville, 18 March
- 1803: Cassandre-Agamemnon et Colombine-Cassandre, parody of Agamemnon, in 1 act, in prose, mingled with vaudevilles, with Pierre-Yves Barré, Jean-Baptiste Radet and Armand Gouffé, Théâtre du Vaudeville, 2 December
- 1803: Chapelain, ou la Ligue des auteurs contre Boileau, comédie en vaudeville in 1 act and in prose, with Pierre-Yves Barré and Jean-Baptiste Radet, Théâtre du Vaudeville, 23 December
- 1804: La Tapisserie de la reine Mathilde, comedy in 1 act, in prose, mingled with vaudevilles, with Pierre-Yves Barré and Jean-Baptiste Radet, Théâtre du Vaudeville, 14 January
- 1804: Duguay-Trouin, prisonnier à Plymouth, historical fact in 2 acts, with Pierre-Yves Barré, Jean-Baptiste Radet and Saint-Félix, Théâtre du Vaudeville, 14 April
- 1804: Bertrand Duguesclin et sa sœur, comedy in 2 acts and in prose mingled with vaudevilles, with Pierre-Yves Barré and Jean-Baptiste Radet, Théâtre du Vaudeville, 27 November
- 1805: Sophie Arnould, comedy in 3 acts and in prose, mingled with vaudevilles, with Pierre-Yves Barré and Jean-Baptiste Radet, Théâtre du Vaudeville, January
- 1805: Le Vaudeville au camp de Boulogne, prologue impromptu, with Pierre-Yves Barré and Jean-Baptiste Radet, Boulogne-sur-Mer, 17 August
- 1805: Les Écriteaux, ou René Le Sage à la foire Saint-Germain, pièce anecdotique in 2 acts and in prose, mingled with vaudevilles, with Pierre-Yves Barré and Jean-Baptiste Radet, Théâtre du Vaudeville, December
- 1806: Les Deux n'en font qu'un, comedy in 1 act and in prose, mingled with vaudevilles, followed by a divertissement on the occasion of peace, with Pierre-Yves Barré and Jean-Baptiste Radet, Théâtre du Vaudeville, 31 January
- 1806: Omazette, ou Jozet en Champagne, parody of Omasis, ou Joseph en Égypte, comédie en vaudeville in 1 act, with Pierre-Yves Barré and Jean-Baptiste Radet, Théâtre du Vaudeville, 6 October
- 1806 Le Rêve, ou la Colonne de Rosback, divertissement de circonstance, in prose and vaudevilles, with Pierre-Yves Barré and Jean-Baptiste Radet, Théâtre du Vaudeville, 15 November
- 1807: Le Château et la Chaumière, ou les Arts et la reconnaissance, comedy in 3 acts, Théâtre du Vaudeville, 22 January
- 1807: L'Ile de la Mégalantropogénésie, ou les Savants de naissance, comédie en vaudeville in 1 act, with Pierre-Yves Barré, Jean-Baptiste Radet and Michel Dieulafoy, Théâtre du Vaudeville, 26 May
- 1807: L'Hôtel de la Paix, rue de la Victoire, à Paris, comédie en vaudeville in 1 act, with Pierre-Yves Barré, Jean-Baptiste Radet and Michel Dieulafoy, Théâtre du Vaudeville, 3 July
- 1808: Le Voyage de Chambord, ou la Veille de la première représentation du Bourgeois gentilhomme, comedy in 1 act, mingled with vaudevilles, with Henri Dupin, Théâtre du Vaudeville, 11 July
- 1809: Le Peintre français en Espagne, ou le Dernier soupir de l'Inquisition, comédie en vaudeville in 1 act, with Pierre-Yves Barré and Jean-Baptiste Radet, Théâtre du Vaudeville, 11 March
- 1809: Lantara, ou le Peintre au cabaret, comédie en vaudeville in 1 act, with Pierre-Yves Barré, Jean-Baptiste Radet and Louis Picard, Théâtre du Vaudeville, 2 October Read online
- 1810: M. Durelief, ou Petite revue des embellissements de Paris, in prose and in vaudevilles, with Pierre-Yves Barré and Jean-Baptiste Radet, Théâtre du Vaudeville, 9 June
- 1810: Les Deux Lions, vaudeville in 1 act, with Pierre-Yves Barré, Jean-Baptiste Radet and Louis-Benoît Picard, Théâtre du Vaudeville, 2 Octobre
- 1811: La Nouvelle télégraphique, comédie en vaudeville in 1 act, with Pierre-Yves Barré and Jean-Baptiste Radet, Théâtre du Vaudeville, 21 March
- 1811: Les Deux Edmond, comedy in 2 acts and in prose, with Pierre-Yves Barré and Jean-Baptiste Radet, Théâtre du Vaudeville, 18 April
- 1811: Laujon de retour à l'ancien Caveau, comédie en vaudeville in 1 act, par les convives du Caveau moderne, with Pierre-Yves Barré and Jean-Baptiste Radet, Théâtre du Vaudeville, 2 December
- 1811: Les Amazones et les Scythes, ou Sauter le fossé, comédie en deux actes, avec Pierre-Yves Barré et Jean-Baptiste Radet, Paris, Théâtre du Vaudeville, 19 December
- 1812: Les Limites, comedy in 1 act, mingled with vaudevilles, with Pierre-Yves Barré and Jean-Baptiste Radet, Théâtre du Vaudeville, 19 September
- 1812: Gaspard l'avisé, comédie anecdotique in 1 act, in prose and vaudevilles, with Pierre-Yves Barré and Jean-Baptiste Radet, Théâtre du Vaudeville, 27 October
- 1813: Le Billet trouvé, comédie en vaudeville in 1 act, with Pierre-Yves Barré and Jean-Baptiste Radet, Théâtre des Variétés, 3 May
- 1814: Un Petit voyage du Vaudeville, divertissement in 1 act, for the return of peace, with Pierre-Yves Barré and Jean-Baptiste Radet, Théâtre du Vaudeville, 5 May
- 1815: Les Trois Saphos lyonnaises, ou Une vour d'amour, comédie en vaudeville in 2 acts, with Pierre-Yves Barré and Jean-Baptiste Radet, Théâtre du Vaudeville, 14 January

Varia

- 1765: Lettres de Sophie et du chevalier de **, pour servir de supplément aux lettres du marquis de Roselle, 2 vol.
- 1779–1781 Histoire universelle des théâtres de toutes les nations, depuis Thespis jusqu'à nos jours, with Jean-Marie-Louis Coupé, Testu and Le Fuel de Méricourt, 13 vol.
- 1785: Les Quatre Saisons littéraires, 2 vol. Text online : Le Printemps Text online : L'Été

== Sources ==
- Gustave Vapereau, Dictionnaire universel des littératures, Paris, Hachette, 1876, p. 615-6
