= Ancien régime =

French sociopolitical system before 1789

Louis XIV (the Sun King), under whose reign the ancien régime reached an absolutist form of government; portrait by Hyacinthe Rigaud, 1701

The Storming of the Bastille on 14 July 1789, later taken to mark the end of the ancien régime

The ancien régime (/ˌɒ̃sjæ̃ reɪˈʒiːm/; French: [ɑ̃sjɛ̃ ʁeʒim]; lit. 'former regime') was the political and social system of the Kingdom of France that the French Revolution overturned. This was accomplished through the abolition in 1790 of the feudal system of the French nobility, the declaration of a republic in 1792, and the execution of Louis XVI in 1793. "Ancien régime" is now a common metaphor for "a system or mode no longer prevailing". (Note: According to the Oxford English Dictionary (second edition, 1989) and the New Oxford American Dictionary (third edition, 2010), the original French is translated "old rule". The term no longer needs to be italicised since it has become part of the English language. According to the New Oxford American Dictionary (2010), when it is capitalised, it refers specifically to the political and social system in France before the French Revolution. When it is not capitalised, it can refer to any political or social system that has been displaced.)

The administrative and social structures of the ancien régime in France evolved across centuries of state-building, legislative acts (like the Ordinance of Villers-Cotterêts), and internal conflicts. The attempts of the House of Valois to reform and re-establish control over the scattered political centres of the country were hindered by the Wars of Religion from 1562 to 1598. During the House of Bourbon, much of the reigns of Henry IV (r. 1589–1610) and Louis XIII (r. 1610–1643) and the early years of Louis XIV (r. 1643–1715) focused on administrative centralization. Despite the notion of "absolute monarchy" (typified by the king's right to issue orders through lettres de cachet) and efforts to create a centralized state, ancien régime France remained a country of systemic irregularities: administrative, legal, judicial, and ecclesiastic divisions and prerogatives frequently overlapped, the French nobility struggled to maintain their influence in local judiciary and state branches while the Fronde and other major internal conflicts violently contested additional centralization.

The drive for centralization related directly to questions of royal finances and the ability to wage war. The internal conflicts and dynastic crises of the 16th and the 17th centuries between Catholics and Protestants, the Habsburgs' internal family conflict, and the territorial expansion of France in the 17th century all demanded great sums, which needed to be raised by taxes, such as the land tax (taille) and the tax on salt (gabelle), and by contributions of men and service from the nobility.

One key to the centralization was the replacing of personal patronage systems, which had been organised around the king and other nobles, by institutional systems that were constructed around the state. The appointments of intendants, representatives of royal power in the provinces, greatly undermined the local control by regional nobles. The same was true of the greater reliance that was shown by the royal court on the noblesse de robe as judges and royal counselors. The creation of regional parlements had the same initial goal of facilitating the introduction of royal power into the newly assimilated territories, but as the parlements gained in self-assurance, they started to become sources of disunity.

== Origin of term ==
By the end of 1789 the term Ancien Régime was commonly used in France by journalists and legislators to refer to the institutions of French life before the Revolution. It first appeared in print in English in 1794 (two years after the inauguration of the French First Republic) and was originally pejorative. Simon Schama has observed that "virtually as soon as the term was coined, 'old regime' was automatically freighted with associations of both traditionalism and senescence. It conjured up a society so encrusted with anachronisms that only a shock of great violence could free the living organism within. Institutionally torpid, economically immobile, culturally atrophied and socially stratified, this 'old regime' was incapable of self-modernization".

== Foreign policy ==
=== Nine Years' War: 1688–1697 ===
The Nine Years' War (1688–97), between France and a coalition of Austria and the Holy Roman Empire, the Dutch Republic, Spain, England and Savoy, was fought in continental Europe and on the surrounding seas, and in Ireland, North America and India. It was the first truly global war.

Louis XIV emerged from the Franco-Dutch War in 1678 with increased influence in Europe and consolidated authority within France. Through a combination of military campaigns, annexation and quasi legal means, he sought to extend and secure France's frontiers, a process that culminated in the War of the Reunions (1683–1684). The resulting Truce of Ratisbon recognized France's territorial acquisitions for a period of 20 years. Subsequent developments, including the revocation of the Edict of Nantes in 1685, contributed to growing tensions with other European powers. Louis XIV's decision to cross the Rhine in September 1688 was intended to advance French territorial and dynastic claims and to influence the policies of the Holy Roman Empire. In response, Leopold I, and several German princes resolved to resist French expansion. The States General and William III subsequently brought the Dutch and the England into the war against France, creating a broad coalition that opposed Louis XIV's policies and contributed to the outbreak of the Nine Years' War.

The main fighting took place around France's borders in the Spanish Netherlands, the Rhineland, the Duchy of Savoy, and Catalonia. The fighting generally favoured Louis XIV's armies, but by 1696, France was in the grip of an economic crisis. The maritime powers (England and the Dutch Republic) were also financially exhausted, and when Savoy defected from the alliance, all of the parties were keen for a negotiated settlement. By the terms of the Treaty of Ryswick (1697), Louis XIV retained the whole of Alsace, but was forced to return Lorraine to its ruler and to give up any gains on the right bank of the Rhine. Also, Louis XIV accepted William III as the rightful King of England, and the Dutch acquired their barrier fortress system in the Spanish Netherlands to help secure their own borders. However, with the ailing and childless Charles II of Spain approaching his end, a new conflict over the inheritance of the Spanish Empire would soon embroil Louis XIV and the Grand Alliance in a final war: the War of the Spanish Succession.

=== War of the Spanish Succession: 1701–1713 ===
Spain had a number of major assets apart from its homeland. It controlled important territory in Europe and the New World. Spain's American colonies produced enormous quantities of silver, brought to Spain every few years in convoys.

Spain also had many weaknesses. Its domestic economy had little business, industry or advanced craftsmanship and was poor. Spain had to import practically all of its weapons and its large army was poorly trained and poorly equipped. Spain had a small navy since seamanship was a low priority for the elites. Local and regional governments and the local nobility, controlled most of the decisionmaking. The central government was quite weak, with a mediocre bureaucracy, and few able leaders. King Charles II reigned 1665 to 1700, but was in very poor physical and mental health.

As King Charles II had no children, the question of who would succeed to the Spanish throne unleashed a major war. The Vienna-based Habsburg family, to which Charles II belonged, proposed its own candidate for the throne. However, the Bourbons, the ruling family of France, instinctively opposed expansions of Habsburg power within Europe and had their own candidate: Philip, the grandson of the powerful Louis XIV. That was a confrontation between two different styles of ancien régime: the French and Spanish style versus the Habsburg style.

Spain's silver and its inability to protect its assets made it a highly visible target for ambitious Europeans. For generations, Englishmen contemplated capturing the Spanish treasure fleet, a feat that had been accomplished only once: in 1628 by the Dutchman Piet Hein. English mariners nevertheless seriously pursued the opportunities for privateering and trade in Spain's colonies.

As he neared his death, Charles II bequeathed his throne to the Bourbon candidate, the future Philip V of Spain. Philip's grandfather, Louis XIV, eagerly endorsed the choice and made unilateral aggressive moves to safeguard the viability of his family's new possessions, such as moving the French army into the Spanish Netherlands and securing exclusive trading rights for the French in Spanish America. However, a coalition of enemies opposed to that rapid expansion of French power quickly formed, and a major European war broke out from 1701 to 1714.

To France's enemies, the notion of France gaining enormous strength by taking over Spain and all its European and overseas possessions was anathema. Furthermore, the prospect of capturing Spanish territories in the New World proved very attractive. France's enemies formed a Grand Alliance, led by the Holy Roman Empire's Leopold I, which included Prussia and most of the other German states, the Dutch Republic, Portugal, Savoy (in Italy) and England. The opposing alliance was primarily France and Spain but also included a few smaller German princes and dukes in Italy. Extensive back-and-forth fighting took place in the Netherlands, but the dimensions of the war once again changed when both Emperor Leopold and his son and successor, Joseph, died. That left Archduke Charles, the second son of Leopold, younger brother to Joseph, as the Alliance candidate for both king of Spain and Holy Roman Emperor.

Since such a union between Spain and the Holy Roman Empire would be too powerful in the eyes of Charles VI's allies, most of the allies quickly concluded a separate peace with France. After another year of fruitless campaigning, Charles VI did the same and abandoned his desire to become the king of Spain.

The 1713 Treaty of Utrecht resolved all these issues. France gave up Newfoundland and Nova Scotia. Louis XIV's grandson became King Philip V of Spain and kept all of his overseas colonies but renounced any rights to the French throne. Spain lost its European holdings outside the homeland itself.

The former members of the alliance also profited from the war. The Dutch maintained their independence in the face of French aggression. The Habsburgs picked up territory north of Austria and in Italy, including the Spanish Netherlands and Naples. However, the greatest beneficiary of the war was Great Britain, since in addition to extensive extra-European territorial gains at the expense of Spain and France, it established further checks to French expansion within the continent by moderately strengthening its European allies.

=== Peaceful interlude: 1715–1740 ===
The quarter-century after the Treaty of Utrecht was peaceful, with no major wars. The main powers exhausted themselves in warfare, and suffered many deaths, disabled veterans, ruined navies, high pension costs, heavy loans and high taxes. In 1683, indirect taxes had brought in 118,000,000 livres, but by 1714, these revenues had plunged to only 46,000,000 livres.

Louis XIV, with his eagerness for warfare, was gone and replaced by a small sickly child, the last Bourbon survivor. This death had the potential to throw France into another round of warfare. Louis XV lived until the 1770s. France's main foreign policy decisionmaker was Cardinal André-Hercule de Fleury, who recognised France's need to rebuild and so pursued a peaceful policy.

France had a poorly designed taxation system in which tax farmers kept much of the money, and the treasury was always short. The banking system in Paris was undeveloped, and the treasury was forced to borrow at very high interest rates. London's financial system proved strikingly competent in funding not only the British Army but also those of its allies. Queen Anne was dead, and her successor, King George I, was a Hanoverian who moved his court to London but never became fluent in English and surrounded himself with German advisors. They spent much of their time and most of their attention on Hanoverian affairs. He too was threatened by an unstable throne, since the Stuart pretenders, long supported by Louis XIV, threatened repeatedly to invade through Ireland or Scotland and had significant internal support from the Tory faction. However, Sir Robert Walpole was the dominant decision-maker from 1722 to 1740, in a role that would later be called prime minister. Walpole strongly rejected militaristic options and promoted a peace program that was agreed to by Fleury, and the two powers formed an alliance.

The Dutch Republic was much reduced in power and so agreed with Britain's idea of peace. In Vienna, the Holy Roman Empire's Habsburg emperors bickered with the new Bourbon king of Spain, Philip V, over Habsburg control of most of Italy, but relations with France were undramatic.

== Provinces and administrative divisions ==
=== Territorial expansion ===
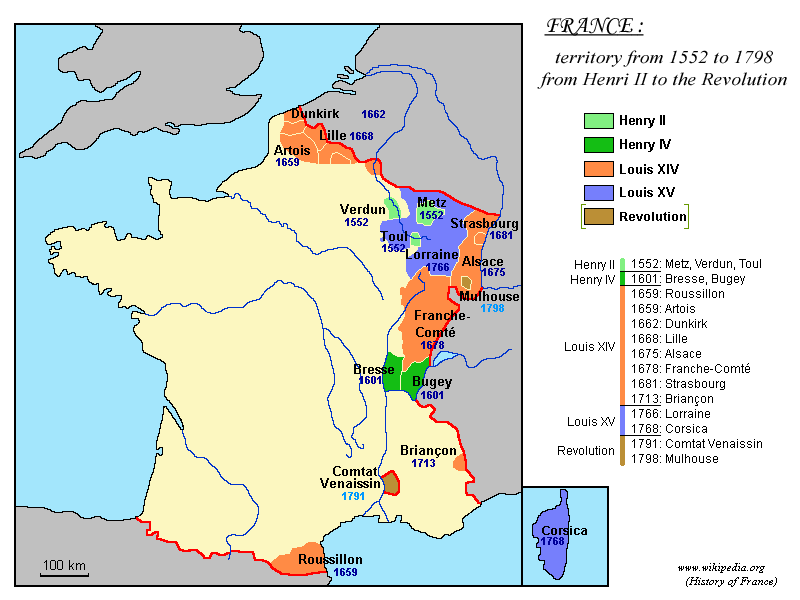
French territorial expansion from 1552 to 1798

In the mid-15th century, France was smaller than it is today, (Note: In 1492, roughly 450,000 km^{2} compared to 550,000 km^{2} today.) and numerous border provinces (such as Roussillon, Cerdagne, Conflent, Vallespir, Capcir, Calais, Béarn, Navarre, County of Foix, Flanders, Artois, Lorraine, Alsace, Trois-Évêchés, Franche-Comté, Savoy, Bresse, Bugey, Gex, Nice, Provence, Dauphiné and Brittany) were autonomous or belonged to the Holy Roman Empire, the Crown of Aragon or the Kingdom of Navarra; there were also foreign enclaves like the Comtat Venaissin.

In addition, certain provinces within France were ostensibly the personal fiefs of noble families. Notably the Bourbonnais, Forez and Auvergne were held by the House of Bourbon until the provinces were forcibly integrated into the royal domain in 1527 after the fall of Charles III, Duke of Bourbon.

From the late 15th century to the late 17th century and again in the 1760s, French territory greatly expanded and it attempted to better integrate its provinces into an administrative whole.

==== French acquisitions from 1461 to 1768 ====
- under Louis XI – Provence (1482), Dauphiné (1461, under French control since 1349)
- under Louis XII – Milan (1500, lost in 1521), Naples (1500, lost in 1504)
- under Francis I – Brittany (1532)
- under Henry II – de facto Trois-Évêchés (Metz, Toul, Verdun) (1552), Calais (1559)
- under Henry IV – County of Foix (1607)
- under Louis XIII – Béarn and Navarre (1620, under French control since 1589 as part of Henry IV's possessions)

France in 1477. Red line: Boundary of the Kingdom of France; Light blue: the directly held royal domain.

- under Louis XIV
  - Treaty of Westphalia (1648) – cities of the Décapole in Alsace and de jure Trois-Evêchés
  - Treaty of the Pyrenees (1659) – Artois, Northern Catalonia (Roussillon, Cerdagne)
  - Treaty of Nijmegen (1678–79) – Franche-Comté, Flanders
  - Treaty of Ryswick (1697) - Alsace and Strasbourg
- under Louis XV – Lorraine (1766), Corsica (1768)

=== Administration ===
Despite centralization efforts of the kings, France remained a patchwork of local privileges and historical differences. The arbitrary power of the absolute monarchy was much limited by historic and regional particularities. Administrative (including taxation), legal (parlement), judicial and ecclesiastic divisions and prerogatives frequently overlapped (for example, French bishoprics and dioceses rarely coincided with administrative divisions).

Certain provinces and cities had won special privileges, such as lower rates for the gabelle or salt tax. Southern France was governed by written law adapted from the Roman legal system, but northern France used common law, codified in 1453 into a written form.

The representative of the king in his provinces and cities was the gouverneur. Royal officers chosen from the highest nobility, provincial and city governors (oversight of provinces and cities was frequently combined) were predominantly military positions in charge of defense and policing. Provincial governors, also called lieutenants généraux, also had the ability to convoke provincial parlements, provincial estates and municipal bodies.

The title gouverneur first appeared under Charles VI. The Ordinance of Blois in 1579 reduced their number to 12, and an ordinance of 1779 increased their number to 39 (18 first-class governors and 21 second-class governors). Although in principle, they were the king's representatives, and their charges could be revoked at the king's will, some governors had installed themselves and their heirs as a provincial dynasty.

The governors reached the height of their power from the mid-16th to the mid-17th century. Their role in provincial unrest during the civil wars led Cardinal Richelieu to create the more tractable positions of intendants of finance, policing and justice, and in the 18th century, the role of provincial governors was greatly curtailed.

Major provinces of France, with provincial capitals. Cities in bold had provincial parlements or conseils souverains during the ancien régime. Note: The map reflects France's modern borders and does not indicate the territorial formation of France over time. Provinces on the list may encompass several other historic provinces and counties (for example, at the revolution, Guyenne was made up of eight smaller historic provinces, including Quercy and Rouergue).

1. Île-de-France (**Paris**)
2. Berry (Bourges)
3. Orléanais (Orléans)
4. Normandy (**Rouen**)
5. Languedoc (**Toulouse**)
6. Lyonnais (Lyon)
7. Dauphiné (**Grenoble**)
8. Champagne (Troyes)
9. Aunis (La Rochelle)
10. Saintonge (Saintes)
11. Poitou (Poitiers)
12. Guyenne and Gascony (**Bordeaux**)
13. Burgundy (**Dijon**)
14. Picardy (Amiens)
15. Anjou (Angers)
16. Provence (**Aix-en-Provence**)
17. Angoumois (Angoulême)
18. Bourbonnais (Moulins)
19. Marche (Guéret)
20. Brittany (**Rennes**, parlement briefly at Nantes)
21. Maine (Le Mans)
22. Touraine (Tours)
23. Limousin (Limoges)
24. Foix (Foix)

25. Auvergne (Clermont-Ferrand)
26. Béarn (**Pau**)
27. Alsace (Strasbourg, cons. souv. in **Colmar**)
28. Artois (cons provinc. in **Arras**)
29. Roussillon (cons. souv. in **Perpignan**)
30. Flanders and Hainaut (Lille, parliament first in Tournai, then in **Douai**)
31. Franche-Comté (**Besançon**, formerly at Dole)
32. Lorraine (**Nancy**)
33. Corsica (off map, Ajaccio, cons. souv. in **Bastia**)
34. Nivernais (Nevers)
35. Comtat Venaissin (Avignon), a Papal fief
36. Imperial Free City of Mulhouse
37. Savoy, a Sardinian fief (parl. in **Chambéry** 1537–59)
38. Nice, a Sardinian fief
39. Montbéliard, a fief of Württemberg
40. (not indicated) Trois-Évêchés (**Metz**, Toul and Verdun)
41. (not indicated) Dombes (**Trévoux**)
42. (not indicated) Navarre (Saint-Jean-Pied-de-Port)
43. (not indicated) Soule (Mauléon)
44. (not indicated) Bigorre (Tarbes)
45. (not indicated) Beaujolais (Beaujeu)
46. (not indicated) Bresse (Bourg)
47. (not indicated) Perche (Mortagne-au-Perche)

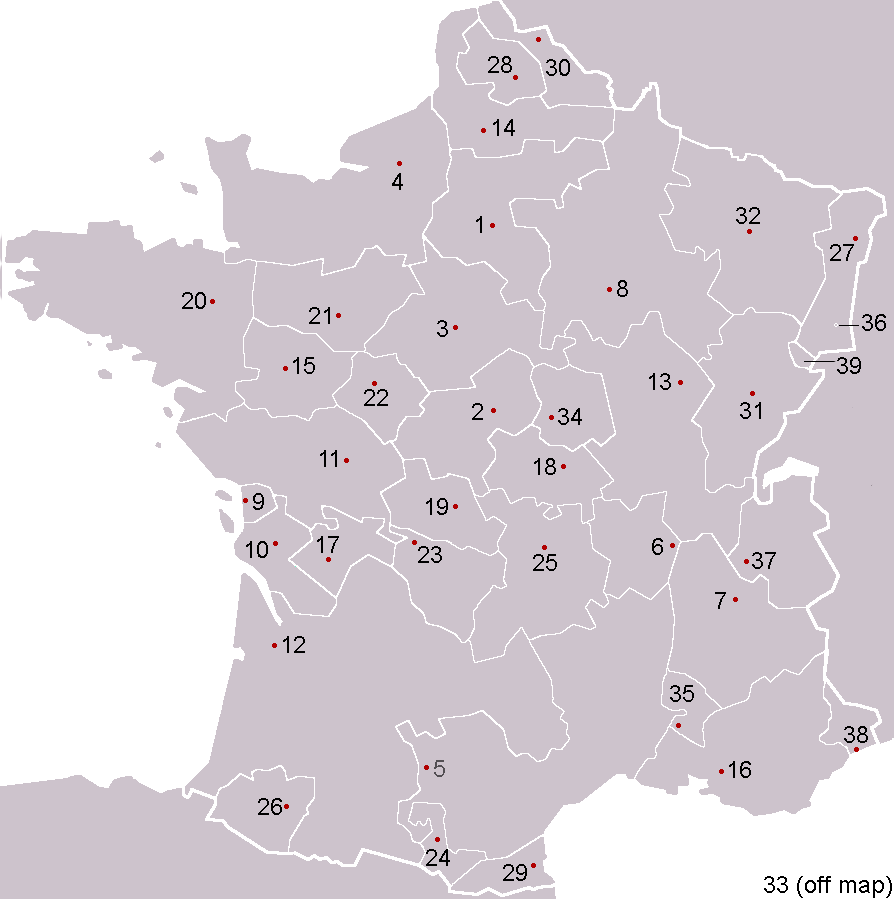

In an attempt to reform the system, new divisions were created. The recettes générales, commonly known as généralités, were initially only taxation districts (see "state finances" below). The first 16 were created in 1542 by edict of Henry II. Their role steadily increased, and by the mid-17th century, the généralités were under the authority of an intendant and were a vehicle for the expansion of royal power in matters of justice, taxation and policing. By the revolution, there were 36 généralités, the last two being created in 1784.

Généralités of France by city (and province). Areas in red are pays d'état (note: should also include 36, 37 and parts of 35); white pays d'élection; yellow pays d'imposition (see State finances below).

1. Généralité of Bordeaux, (Agen, Guyenne)
2. Généralité of Provence, or Aix-en-Provence (Provence)
3. Généralité of Amiens (Picardy)
4. Généralité of Bourges (Berry)
5. Généralité of Caen (Normandy)
6. Généralité of Châlons (Champagne)
7. Généralité of Burgundy, Dijon (Burgundy)
8. Généralité of Grenoble (Dauphiné)
9. Généralité of Issoire, later of Riom (Auvergne)
10. Généralité of Lyon (Lyonnais, Beaujolais and Forez)
11. Généralité of Montpellier (Languedoc)
12. Généralité of Paris (Île-de-France)
13. Généralité of Poitiers (Poitou)
14. Généralité of Rouen (Normandy)
15. Généralité of Toulouse (Languedoc)
16. Généralité of Tours (Touraine, Maine and Anjou) 17. Généralité of Metz (Trois-Évêchés)
18. Généralité of Nantes (Brittany)
19. Généralité of Limoges (divided in two parts: Angoumois & Limousin – Marche)

20. Généralité of Orléans (Orléanais)
21. Généralité of Moulins (Bourbonnais)
22. Généralité of Soissons (Picardy)
23. Généralité of Montauban (Gascony)
24. Généralité of Alençon (Perche)
25. Généralité of Perpignan (Roussillon)
26. Généralité of Besançon (Franche-Comté)
27. Généralité of Valenciennes (Hainaut)
28. Généralité of Strasbourg (Alsace)
29. (see 18)
30. Généralité of Lille (Flanders)
31. Généralité of La Rochelle (Aunis and Saintonge)
32. Généralité of Nancy (Lorraine)
33. Généralité of Trévoux (Dombes)
34. Généralité of Corsica, or Bastia (Corsica)
35. Généralité of Auch (Gascony)
36. Généralité of Bayonne (Labourd)
37. Généralité of Pau (Béarn and Soule)

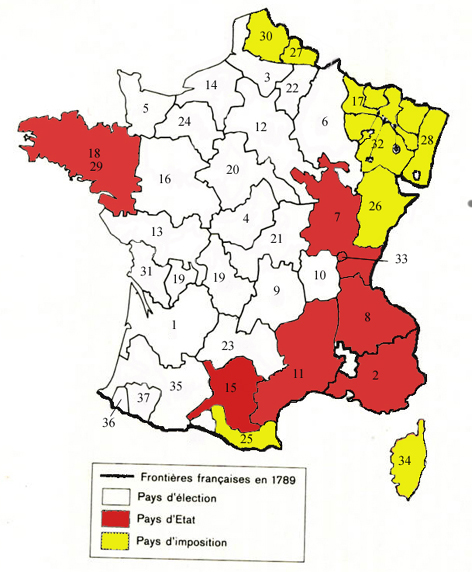

== State finances ==
The desire for more efficient tax collection was one of the major causes for French administrative and royal centralisation during the early modern period. The taille became a major source of royal income. Exempted were clergy and nobles (except for non-noble lands held in pays d'état, see below), officers of the crown, military personnel, magistrates, university professors and students, and certain cities (villes franches) such as Paris.

The provinces were of three sorts, the pays d'élection, the pays d'état and the pays d'imposition. In the pays d'élection (the longest-held possessions of the French crown; some of the provinces had held the equivalent autonomy of a pays d'état but had lost it through the effects of royal reforms) the assessment and collection of taxes were trusted to elected officials (at least originally, since later on those positions were bought), and the tax was generally "personal" and so was attached to non-noble individuals.

In the pays d'état ("provinces with provincial estates"), Brittany, Languedoc, Burgundy, Auvergne, Béarn, Dauphiné, Provence and portions of Gascony, such as Bigorre, Comminges and the Quatre-Vallées, recently acquired provinces that had been able to maintain a certain local autonomy in terms of taxation, the assessment of the tax was established by local councils and the tax was generally "real" and so was attached to non-noble lands (nobles with such lands were required to pay taxes on them). Pays d'imposition were recently conquered lands that had their own local historical institutions (they were similar to the pays d'état under which they are sometimes grouped), but taxation was overseen by the royal intendant.

=== Taxation history ===
Taxation districts had gone through a variety of mutations since the 14th century. Before the 14th century, oversight of the collection of royal taxes had fallen generally to the baillis and sénéchaux in their circumscriptions. Reforms in the 14th and the 15th centuries saw France's royal financial administration run by two financial boards, which worked in a collegial manner: the four Généraux des finances (also called général conseiller or receveur général) oversaw the collection of taxes (taille, aides, etc.) by tax-collecting agents (receveurs) and the four Trésoriers de France (Treasurers) oversaw revenues from royal lands (the "domaine royal").

Together, they were the Messieurs des finances. The four members of each board were divided by geographical districts (although the term généralité appears only in the late 15th century). The areas were named Languedoïl, Languedoc, Outre-Seine-and-Yonne, and Normandy (the last was created in 1449, the other three earlier), with the directors of the "Languedoïl" region typically having an honorific preeminence. By 1484, the number of généralités had increased to six.

In the 16th century, the kings of France, in an effort to exert more direct control over royal finances and to circumvent the double board, which was accused of poor oversight, made numerous administrative reforms, including the restructuring of the financial administration and increasing the number of généralités. In 1542, France was divided into 16 généralités. The number increased to 21 at the end of the 16th century and to 36 at the time of the French Revolution; the last two were created in 1784.

The administration of the généralités of the Renaissance went through a variety of reforms. In 1577, Henry III established 5 treasurers (trésoriers généraux) in each généralité who formed a bureau of finances. In the 17th century, oversight of the généralités was subsumed by the intendants of finance, justice and police. The expression généralité and intendance became roughly synonymous.

Until the late 17th century, tax collectors were called receveurs. In 1680, the system of the Ferme générale was established, a franchised customs and excise operation in which individuals bought the right to collect the taille on behalf of the king, through six-year adjudications (certain taxes like the aides and the gabelle had been farmed out in this way as early as 1604). The major tax collectors in that system were known as the fermiers généraux ('farmers-general").

The taille was only one of a number of taxes. There also existed the taillon (a tax for military purposes), a national salt tax (the gabelle), national tariffs (the aides) on various products (wine, beer, oil and other goods), local tariffs on speciality products (the douane) or levied on products entering the city (the octroi) or sold at fairs and local taxes. Finally, the church benefited from a mandatory tax or tithe, the dîme.

Louis XIV created several additional tax systems, including the capitation, which began in 1695 and touched every person, including nobles and the clergy although exemption could be bought for a large one-time sum and the "dixième" (1710–1717, restarted in 1733), which enacted to support the military and was a true tax on income and on property value. In 1749, under Louis XV, a new tax based on the dixième, the vingtième, was enacted to reduce the royal deficit and continued for the rest of the ancien régime.

==== Fees for holding state positions ====
Another key source of state financing was through charging fees for state positions (such as most members of parlements, magistrates, maître des requêtes and financial officers). Many of the fees were quite high, but some of the offices conferred nobility and could be financially advantageous. The use of offices to seek profit had become standard practice as early as the 12th and the 13th centuries. A law in 1467 made these offices irrevocable except through the death, resignation or forfeiture of the title holder, and the offices, once bought, tended to become hereditary charges that were passed on within families with a fee for transfer of title.

In an effort to increase revenue, the state often turned to the creation of new offices. Before it was made illegal in 1521, it had been possible to leave the date that the transfer of title was to take effect open-ended. In 1534, a rule adapted from church practice made the successor's right void if the preceding office holder died within forty days of the transfer, and the office returned to the state. However, a new fee, the survivance jouissante protected against that rule. In 1604, Sully created a new tax, the paulette or "annual tax" of a sixtieth of the official charge, which permitted the titleholder to be free of the forty-day rule. The paulette and the venality of offices became key concerns in the parliamentarian revolts of the 1640s called the Fronde.

The state also demanded a "free gift", which the church collected from holders of ecclesiastic offices through taxes called the décime (roughly a twentieth of the official charge, created under Francis I).

State finances also relied heavily on borrowing, both private (from the great banking families in Europe) and public. The most important public source for borrowing was through the system of rentes sur l'Hôtel de Ville of Paris, a kind of government bond system offering investors annual interest. The system first came to use in 1522 under Francis I.

Until 1661, the head of the financial system in France was generally the surintendant des finances. That year, the surintendant Nicolas Fouquet fell from power, and the position was replaced by the less powerful contrôleur général des finances.

== Courts and Law ==
=== Lower courts ===
The Courts and Law in seigneurial lands, including those held by the church or that lay within cities, was generally overseen by the seigneur or his delegated officers. In the 15th century, much of the seigneur's legal purview was given to the bailliages or sénéchaussées and the présidiaux, leaving only affairs concerning seigneurial dues and duties, and small affairs of local justice. Only certain seigneurs, those with the power of haute justice (seigneurial justice was divided into "high" "middle" and "low" justice), could enact the death penalty and only with the consent of the présidiaux.

Crimes of desertion, highway robbery and mendicants (so-called cas prévôtaux) were under the supervision of the prévôt des maréchaux, who exacted quick and impartial justice. In 1670, their purview was overseen by the présidiaux.

The national judicial system was made up of tribunals called bailliages in northern France and sénéchaussées in southern France. These tribunals numbered around 90 in the 16th century and far more at the end of the 18th century, were supervised by a lieutenant général and were subdivided into:

- prévôtés supervised by a prévôt;
- or (as was the case in Normandy) into vicomtés supervised by a vicomte, a position that could also be held by non-nobles;
- or (in parts of northern France) into châtellenies supervised by a châtelain, also a position that could be held by non-nobles;
- or, in the south, into vigueries or baylies supervised by a viguier or a bayle.

To reduce the case load in the parlements, certain bailliages were given extended powers by Henry II of France, which were called présidiaux.

The prévôts or their equivalent were first-level judges for non-nobles and ecclesiastics. In the exercise of their legal functions, they sat alone but had to consult with certain lawyers called avocats or procureurs, whom they chose themselves. To use the technical phrase, these lawyers were "summoned to their council". Appeals of their sentences went to the bailliages, who also had jurisdiction in the first instance over actions brought against nobles. Bailliages and présidiaux were also the first court for certain crimes called cas royaux which had formerly been under the supervision of the local seigneurs: sacrilege, lèse-majesté, kidnapping, rape, heresy, alteration of money, sedition, insurrection and the illegal carrying of arms. Appeals of a bailliage's decisions went to the regional parlements.

The most important of the royal tribunals was the prévôté (Note: Despite being called a prévôté, the prévôté of Paris was effectively a bailliage. See also:) and présidial of Paris, the Châtelet, which was overseen by the prévôt of Paris, civil and criminal lieutenants, and a royal officer in charge of maintaining public order in the capital, the Lieutenant General of Police of Paris.

=== Superior courts ===
The following were cours souveraines, or superior courts, whose decisions could be revoked only by "the king in his conseil" (see administration section below).

- Parlements – eventually 14 in number: Paris, Languedoc (Toulouse), Provence (Aix), Franche-Comté (Besançon), Guyenne (Bordeaux), Burgundy (Dijon), Flanders (Douai), Dauphiné (Grenoble), Trois-Évêchés (Metz), Lorraine (Nancy), Navarre (Pau), Brittany (Rennes, briefly in Nantes), Normandy (Rouen) and (from 1523 to 1771) Dombes (Trévoux). There was also a parlement in Savoy (Chambéry) from 1537 to 1559. The parlements were originally only judicial in nature (appellate courts for lower civil and ecclesiastical courts) but began to subsume limited legislative functions. The most important parlement, both in administrative area (covering most of northern and central France) and prestige, was the parliament of Paris, which also was the court of first instance for peers of the realm and for regalian affairs.
- Conseils souverains – Alsace (Colmar), Roussillon (Perpignan), Artois (a conseil provincial, Arras) and, from 1553 to 1559, Corsica (Bastia); formerly Flanders, Navarre and Lorraine (converted into parlements). The conseils souverains were regional parliaments in recently conquered lands.
- Chambre des comptes – Paris, Dijon, Blois, Grenoble, Nantes. The chambre des comptes supervised the spending of public funds, the protection of royal lands (domaine royal) and legal issues involving those areas.
- Cours des aides – Paris, Clermont, Bordeaux, Montauban. The cours des aides supervised affairs in the pays d'élections, often concerning taxes on wine, beer, soap, oil, metals, etc.
- Chambre des comptes combined with Cours des aides – Aix, Bar-le-Duc, Dole, Nancy, Montpellier, Pau, Rouen
- Cours des monnaies – Paris; additionally Lyon (1704–71), and (after 1766), the chambre des comptes of Bar-le-Duc and Nancy. The cours des monnaies oversaw money, coins and precious metals.
- Grand Conseil – created in 1497 to oversee affairs concerning ecclesiastical benefices; occasionally the king sought the Grand Conseil's intervention in affairs considered too contentious for the parlement.

The head of the judicial system in France was the chancellor.

== Administration ==
One of the established principles of the French monarchy was that the king could not act without the advice of his counsel, and the formula "le roi en son conseil" expressed that deliberative aspect. The administration of the French state in the early modern period went through a long evolution, as a truly administrative apparatus, relying on old nobility, newer chancellor nobility ("noblesse de robe") and administrative professionals, was substituted to the feudal clientelist system.

=== Conseil du Roi ===
Under Charles VIII and Louis XII, the Conseil du Roi (King's Counsel) was dominated by members of about 20 noble or rich families. Under Francis I the number of counsellors increased to roughly 70 (although the old nobility was then proportionally more important than had been in the previous century). The most important positions in the court were those of the Great Officers of the Crown of France, headed by the connétable (chief military officer of the realm) until it was eliminated in 1627) and the chancellor.

The royal administration during the Renaissance was divided between a small counsel (the "secret" and later "high" counsel) of 6 or fewer members (3 members in 1535, 4 in 1554) for important matters of state and a larger counsel for judicial or financial affairs. Francis I was sometimes criticised for relying too heavily on a small number of advisors, and Henry II, Catherine de Medici and their sons found themselves frequently unable to negotiate between the opposing Guise and Montmorency families in their counsel.

Over time, the decision-making apparatus of the council was divided into several royal counsels. Its subcouncils can be generally grouped as "governmental councils", "financial councils" and "judicial and administrative councils". With the names and subdivisions of the 17th and 18th centuries, the subcouncils were the following:

Governmental councils:

- Conseil d'en haut ("High Council", concerning the most important matters of state) – composed of the king, the crown prince (the "dauphin"), the chancellor, the contrôleur général des finances, and the secretary of state in charge of foreign affairs.
- Conseil des dépêches ("Council of Messages", concerning notices and administrative reports from the provinces) – composed of the king, the chancellor, the secretaries of state, the contrôleur général des finances, and other councillors according to the issues discussed.
- Conseil de Conscience

Financial councils:

- Conseil royal des finances ("Royal Council of Finances") – composed of the king, the "chef du conseil des finances" (an honorary post), the chancellor, the contrôleur général des finances and two of his consellors, and the intendants of finance.
- Conseil royal de commerce

Judicial and administrative councils:

- Conseil d'État et des Finances or Conseil ordinaire des Finances – by the late 17th century, its functions were largely taken over by the three following sections.
- Conseil privé or Conseil des parties or Conseil d'État ("Privy Council" or "Council of State", concerning the judicial system, officially instituted in 1557) – the largest of the royal councils, composed of the chancellor, the dukes with peerage, the ministers and secretaries of state, the contrôleur général des finances, the 30 councillors of state, the 80 maître des requêtes and the intendants of finance.
- Grande Direction des Finances
- Petite Direction des Finances

In addition to the above administrative institutions, the king was also surrounded by an extensive personal and court retinue (royal family, valet de chambres, guards, honorific officers), regrouped under the name "Maison du Roi".

At the death of Louis XIV, the Regent Philippe II, Duke of Orléans abandoned several of the above administrative structures, most notably the Secretaries of State, which were replaced by councils. That system of government, called the Polysynody, lasted from 1715 to 1718.

==== 17th-century state positions ====
Under Henry IV and Louis XIII, the administrative apparatus of the court and its councils was expanded and the proportion of the "noblesse de robe" increased and culminated in the following positions during the 17th century:

- First Minister: ministers and secretaries of state – such as Sully, Concini (who was also governor of several provinces), Richelieu, Mazarin, Jean-Baptiste Colbert, Cardinal de Fleury, Turgot, etc. – exerted a powerful control over state administration in the 17th and 18th century. The title "principal ministre de l'état" was, however, given only six times in this period and Louis XIV himself refused to choose a "prime minister" after the death of Mazarin.
- Chancellor of France (also called the "garde des sceaux", or "Keeper of the Seals"; in the case of incapacity or disfavour, the Chancellor was generally permitted to retain his title, but the royal seals were passed to a deputy, called the "garde des sceaux")
- Controller-General of Finances (contrôleur général des finances, formerly called the surintendant des finances).
- Secretaries of State: created in 1547 by Henry II, of greater importance after 1588, generally 4 in number but occasionally 5:
  - Secretary of State for Foreign Affairs
  - Secretary of State for War, also oversaw France's border provinces.
  - Secretary of State of the Navy
  - Secretary of State of the Maison du Roi (the king's royal entourage and personal military guard), who also oversaw the clergy, the affairs of Paris and the non-border provinces.
  - Secretary of State for Protestant Affairs (combined with the secretary of the Maison du Roi in 1749).
- Councillors of state (generally 30)
- Maître des requêtes (generally 80)
- Intendants of finance (6)
- Intendants of commerce (4 or 5)
- Ministers of State (variable)
- Treasurers
- Farmers-General
- Superintendent of the postal system
- Directeur général of buildings
- Directeur général of fortifications
- Lieutenant General of Police of Paris (in charge of public order in the capital)
- Archbishop of Paris
- Royal confessor

Royal administration in the provinces had been the role of the bailliages and sénéchaussées in the Middle Ages, but that declined in the early modern period, and by the late 18th century, the bailliages served only a judicial function. The main source of royal administrative power in the provinces in the 16th and the early 17th centuries fell to the gouverneurs (who represented "the presence of the king in his province"), positions which had long been held by only the highest ranked families in the realm. With the civil wars of the early modern period, the king increasingly turned to more tractable and subservient emissaries, which caused the growth of the provincial intendants under Louis XIII and Louis XIV. Indendants were chosen from among the maître des requêtes. Those attached to a province had jurisdiction over finances, justice and policing.

By the 18th century, royal administrative power had been firmly established in the provinces, despite protestations by local parlements. In addition to their role as appellate courts, regional parlements had gained the privilege to register the edicts of the king and to present the king with official complaints concerning the edicts. They thus had acquired a limited role as the representative voice of (predominantly) the magistrate class. A refusal by the parlement to register the edicts (frequently concerning fiscal matters) allowed the king to impose its registration through a royal assize ("lit de justice").

The other traditional representatives' bodies in the realm were the États généraux (created in 1302), which reunited the three estates of the realm (clergy, nobility and the third estate) and the États provinciaux (Provincial Estates). The États généraux (convoked in this period in 1484, 1560–61, 1576–1577, 1588–1589, 1593, 1614 and 1789) had been reunited during fiscal crises or convoked by parties malcontent with royal prerogatives (the Ligue, the Huguenots), but they had no true power since dissensions between the three orders rendered them weak and they were dissolved before having completed their work. As a sign of French absolutism, they ceased to be convoked from 1614 to 1789. The provincial estates proved to be more effective and were convoked by the king to respond to fiscal and tax policies.

== Religion ==
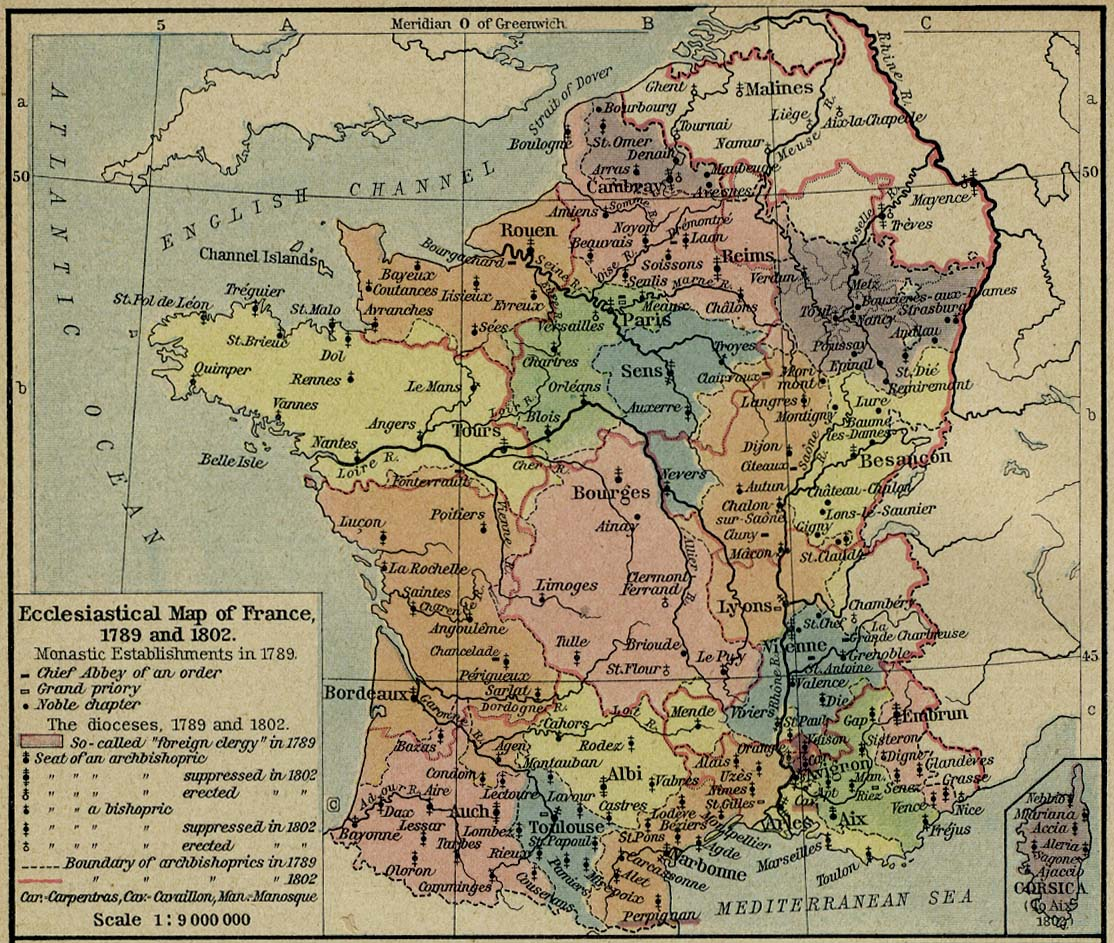
Dioceses of France in 1789

The French monarchy was irrevocably linked to the Catholic Church (the formula was la France est la fille aînée de l'église, or "France is the eldest daughter of the church"), and French theorists of the divine right of kings and sacerdotal power in the Renaissance had made those links explicit. Henry IV was able to ascend to the throne only after abjuring Protestantism. The symbolic power of the Catholic monarch was apparent in his crowning (the king was anointed with blessed oil in Rheims) and he was popularly believed to be able to cure scrofula by laying on his hands (accompanied by the formula "the king touches you, but God heals you").

In 1500, France had 14 archbishoprics (Lyon, Rouen, Tours, Sens, Bourges, Bordeaux, Auch, Toulouse, Narbonne, Aix-en-Provence, Embrun, Vienne, Arles and Rheims) and 100 bishoprics. By the 18th century, archbishoprics and bishoprics had expanded to a total of 139 (see List of Ancien Régime dioceses of France). The upper levels of the French church were made up predominantly of old nobility, both from provincial families and from royal court families, and many of the offices had become de facto hereditary possessions, with some members possessing multiple offices. In addition to the fiefs that church members possessed as seigneurs, the church also possessed seigneurial lands in its own right and enacted justice upon them.

In the early the 16th century, the secular clergy (curates, vicars, canons, etc.) accounted for around 100,000 individuals in France.

Other temporal powers of the church included playing a political role as the first estate in the "États Généraux" and the "États Provinciaux" (Provincial Assemblies) and in Provincial Conciles or Synods convoked by the king to discuss religious issues. The church also claimed a prerogative to judge certain crimes, most notably heresy, although the Wars of Religion did much to place that crime in the purview of the royal courts and parliament. Finally, abbots, cardinals and other prelates were frequently employed by the kings as ambassadors, members of his councils (such as Richelieu and Mazarin) and in other administrative positions.

The faculty of theology of Paris (often called the Sorbonne), maintained a censorship board, which reviewed publications for their religious orthodoxy. The Wars of Religion saw their control over censorship however pass to the parliament and, in the 17th century to the royal censors, although the church maintained a right to petition.

The church was the primary provider of schools (primary schools and "colleges") and hospitals ("hôtel-Dieu", the Sisters of Charity) and distributor of relief to the poor in pre-revolutionary France.

The Pragmatic Sanction of Bourges (1438, suppressed by Louis XI but brought back by the États Généraux of Tours in 1484) gave the election of bishops and abbots to the cathedral chapter houses and abbeys of France, thus stripping the pope of effective control of the French church and permitting the beginning of a Gallican church. However, in 1515, Francis I signed a new agreement with Pope Leo X, the Concordat of Bologna, which gave the king the right to nominate candidates and the pope the right of investiture. The agreement infuriated Gallicans but gave the king control over important ecclesiastical offices with which to benefit nobles.

Although exempted from the taille, the church was required to pay the crown a tax called the "free gift" ("don gratuit"), which it collected from its office holders, at roughly a twentieth the price of the office (that was the "décime", reapportioned every five years). In its turn, the church exacted a mandatory tithe from its parishioners, called the "dîme".

In the Counter-Reformation, the French church created numerous religious orders such as the Jesuits and made great improvements in the quality of its parish priests; the first decades of the 17th century were characterized by a massive outpouring of devotional texts and religious fervor, exemplified in Saint Francis of Sales and Saint Vincent de Paul. Although the Edict of Nantes (1598) permitted the existence of Protestant churches in the realm (characterized as "a state within a state"), over the next eighty years the rights of the Huguenots slowly eroded, until Louis XIV finally revoked the edict in 1685, which caused a massive emigration of Huguenots to other countries. Religious practices that veered too close to Protestantism (like Jansenism) or to the mystical (like Quietism) were also severely suppressed, as were libertinage or overt atheism.

Regular clergy (those in Catholic religious orders) in France numbered into the tens of thousands in the 16th century. Some orders, like the Benedictines, were largely rural; others, like the Dominicans (also called "Jacobins") and the Franciscans (also called "cordeliers") operated in cities.

Although the church came under attack in the 18th century by the philosophers of the Enlightenment and recruitment of clergy and monastic orders dropped after 1750, figures show that on the whole, the population remained a profoundly Catholic country (absenteeism from services did not exceed 1% in the middle of the century). At the eve of the revolution, the church possessed upwards of 7% of the country's land (figures vary) and generated yearly revenues of 150 million livres.

=== Gallicanism ===
Louis XIV supported the Gallican Church to give the government a greater role than the pope in choosing bishops and the revenues from vacant bishoprics. There would be no inquisition in France, and papal decrees only held sway after the government approved them. Louis avoided schism and wanted more royal power over the French Church but did not want to break free of Rome. The pope likewise recognized the "most Christian king" was a powerful ally, who could not be alienated.

=== Monasteries ===
Until the French Revolution, the monastic community constituted a central element of the economic, social, and religious life of many localities under the Old Regime. From the end of the Wars of Religion to the French Revolution, Menat, a Cluniac abbey dating back to 1107, ruled over the Sioule Valley in the northwest region of the Clermont diocese. The monks were large landholders and developed a diversified and complex set of links with their neighbors. They received seigniorial rights; provided work to the rural poor and were in daily contact with notaries public, merchants, and surgeons. While they did not directly manage the religious life of the faithful, which was done by parish priests, monks were a motivating force in it by setting up of a parish clergy, providing alms and social services and playing the role of intercessors.

=== Convents ===
Communities of nuns in France on the eve of Revolution had on average 25 members and a median age of 48 years. Nuns were both entering the profession later and living longer than ever. In general, they had little wealth. Recruitment varied from region to region and by convent lifestyle (active or contemplative, austere or opulent, lower class or middle class). The nature of male and female monasticism differed greatly in France both before and during the revolution. Convents tended to be more isolated and less centrally controlled, which made for greater diversity among them than among male monasteries.

=== Reformation and the Protestant minority ===
French Protestantism, which was largely Calvinist, derived its support from the lesser nobles and trading classes. Its two main strongholds were southwestern France and Normandy, but even there, Catholics were a majority. Protestantism in France was considered to be a grave threat to national unity, as the Huguenot minority felt a closer affinity with German and Dutch Calvinists than with its fellow Frenchmen. In an effort to cement their position, Huguenots often allied with France's enemies. The animosity between the two sides led to the French Wars of Religion and the tragic St. Bartholomew's Day Massacre. The religious wars ended in 1593, when the Huguenot Henry of Navarre (1553–1610), who was already effectively king of France, became a Catholic and was recognized by both Catholics and Protestants as King Henry IV (reigned 1589–1610).

The main provisions of the Edict of Nantes (1598), which Henry IV had issued as a charter of religious freedoms for the Huguenots, allowed Huguenots to hold religious services in certain towns in each province, allowed them to control and fortify eight cities, established special courts to try Huguenots, and gave Huguenots the same civil rights as Catholics.

Military privileges were incorporated in the edict to allay the fears of the minority. Over time, those privileges were clearly open to abuse. In 1620, the Huguenots proclaimed a constitution for the "Republic of the Reformed Churches of France", and Prime Minister Cardinal Richelieu (1585–1642) invoked the full powers of the state and captured La Rochelle after a long siege in 1628. The next year, the Treaty of Alais left the Huguenots their religious freedom but revoked their military freedoms.

Montpellier was among the most important of the 66 villes de sûreté that the 1598 edict had granted to the Huguenots. The city's political institutions and university were handed over to the Huguenots. Tension with Paris led to a siege by the royal army in 1622. Peace terms called for the dismantling of the city's fortifications. A royal citadel was built, and the university and consulate were taken over by the Catholics. Even before the Edict of Alès, Protestant rule was dead and the ville de sûreté was no more.

By 1620 the Huguenots were on the defensive, and the government increasingly applied pressure. A series of small civil wars that broke out in southern France between 1610 and 1635 were long considered by historians to be regional squabbles between rival noble families. New analysis shows that the civil wars were in fact religious in nature and remnants of the French Wars of Religion, which had largely ended by the Edict of Nantes. Small wars in the provinces of Languedoc and Guyenne had Catholics and Calvinists use destruction of churches, iconoclasm, forced conversions and the execution of heretics as weapons of choice.

Louis XIV acted more and more aggressively to force the Huguenots to convert. At first, he sent missionaries, which were backed by a fund to reward converts to Catholicism financially. Then, he imposed penalties, closed Huguenots' schools and excluded them from favorite professions. Escalating the attack, he tried to convert the Huguenots by force by sending armed dragonnades (soldiers) to occupy and loot their houses. Finally, the 1685 Edict of Fontainebleau revoked the Edict of Nantes.

The revocation forbade Protestant services, required children to be educated as Catholics and prohibited most Huguenot emigration. That proved disastrous to the Huguenots and costly for France by precipitating civil bloodshed, ruining commerce and resulting in the illegal flight from the country of about 180,000 Protestants, many of whom became intellectuals, doctors and business leaders in England, Scotland, the Netherlands Prussia and South Africa; also, 4000 went to the American colonies.

The English welcomed the French refugees by providing money from both government and private agencies to aid their relocation. The Huguenots who stayed in France became Catholics and were called "new converts". Only a few Protestant villages remained in isolated areas.

By the 1780s, Protestants comprised about 700,000 people, or 2% of the population. It was no longer a favorite religion of the elite since most Protestants were peasants. Protestantism was still illegal. The law was seldom enforced but could be a threat or a nuisance to Protestants.

Calvinists lived primarily in the southern France, and about 200,000 Lutherans lived in Alsace, where the 1648 Treaty of Westphalia still protected them.

In addition, there were about 40,000 to 50,000 Jews in France, chiefly centred in Bordeaux, Metz and a few other cities. They had very limited rights and opportunities, apart from the moneylending business, but their status was legal.

== Social structure ==
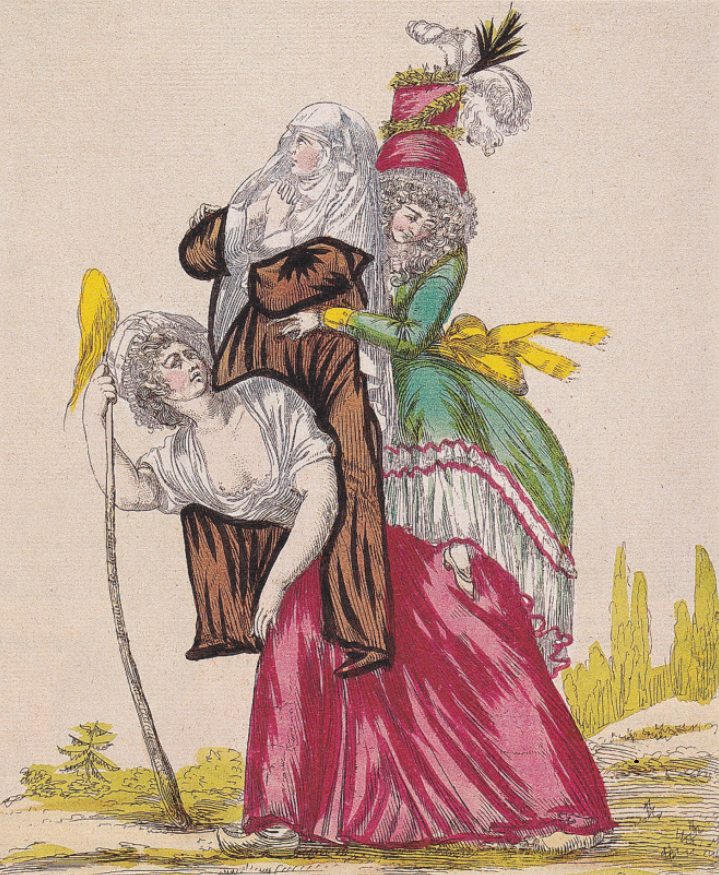
A prerevolutionary cartoon showing the Third Estate carrying on her back the Second Estate (the nobility) and the First Estate (the clergy)

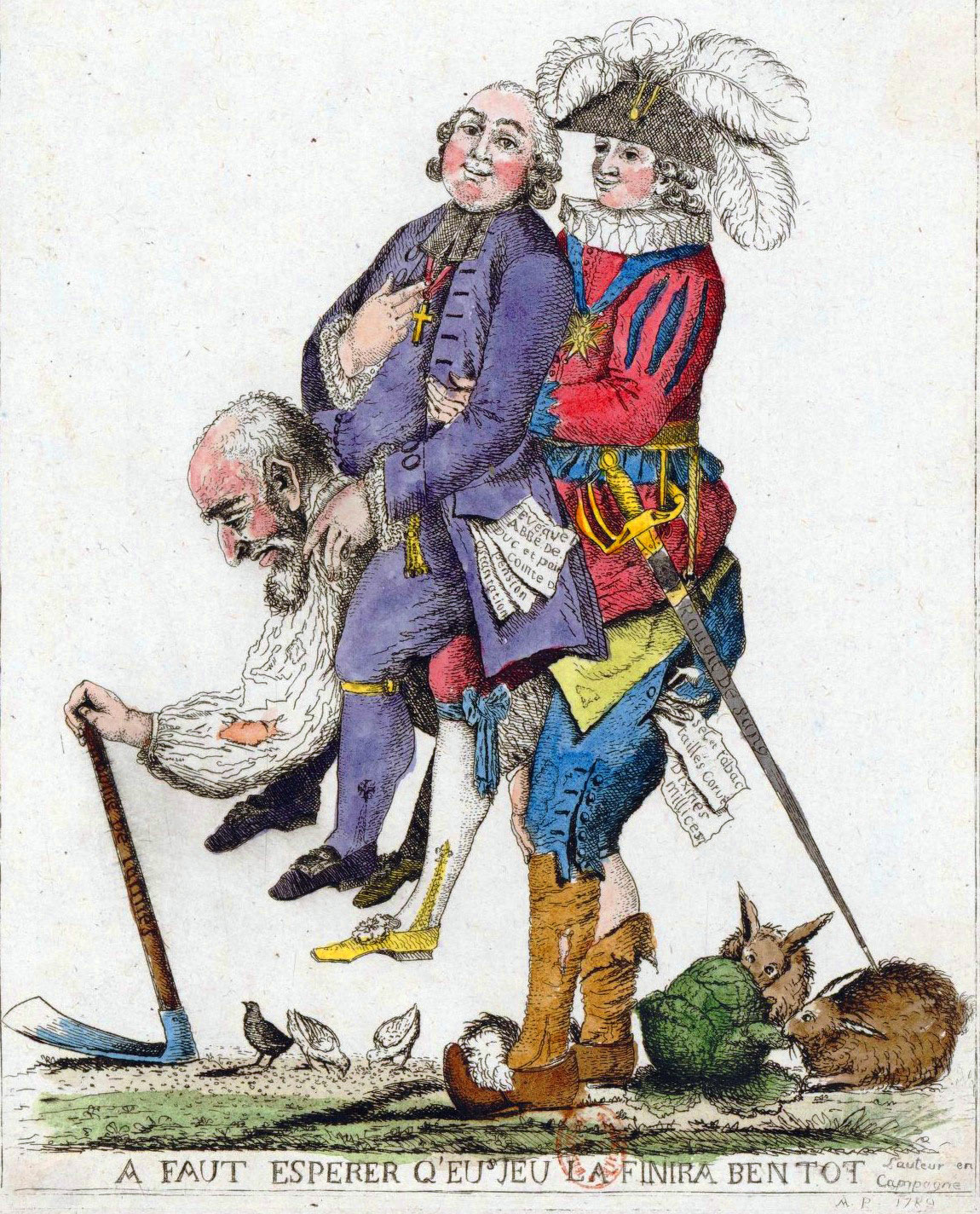
A prerevolutionary cartoon showing the Third Estate carrying on his back the Second Estate (the nobility) and the First Estate (the clergy)

Political power was widely dispersed among the elites. The law courts called parlements were powerful, especially that of France. However, the king had only about 10,000 officials in royal service: very few indeed for a large country with very slow internal communications over an inadequate road system. Travel was usually faster by ocean ship or river boat. The different estates of the realm (the clergy, the nobility, and commoners) occasionally met together in the Estates General, but in practice, the Estates General had no power since it could petition the king but not pass laws itself.

The Catholic Church controlled about 40% of the country's wealth, which was tied up in long-term endowments that could be added to but not reduced. The king, not the pope, nominated bishops, but typically had to negotiate with noble families that had close ties to local monasteries and church establishments.

The nobility came second in terms of wealth but had no unity. Each noble had his own lands, his own network of regional connections and his own military force.

The cities had a quasi-independent status and were largely controlled by the leading merchants and guilds. Paris was by far the largest city, with 220,000 people in 1547 and a history of steady growth. Lyon and Rouen each had about 40,000 population, but Lyon had a powerful banking community and a vibrant culture. Bordeaux was next, with only 20,000 population in 1500.

The role of women has recently received attention, especially regarding their religiosity.

=== Peasants ===
Peasants made up the vast majority of the population, and in many cases had well-established rights the authorities had to respect. In 1484, about 97% of France's 13 million people lived in rural villages. In 1700, at least 80% of the population of 20 million were peasants.

In the 17th century, peasants had ties to the market economy, provided much of the capital investment necessary for agricultural growth and frequently changed villages or towns. Geographic mobility, directly tied to the market and the need for investment capital, was the main path to social mobility. The stable core of French society, town guildspeople and village labourers, included cases of staggering social and geographic continuity, but even that core required regular renewal.

Accepting the existence of both of those societies, the constant tension between them and extensive geographic and social mobility tied to a market economy were the key to the evolution of the social structure, the economy and even the political system of early modern France. The Annales School paradigm underestimated the role of the market economy and failed to explain the nature of capital investment in the rural economy and grossly exaggerated social stability. Demands by peasants played a major role in fashioning the early stages of the French Revolution in 1789.

Historians have explored numerous aspects of peasant life in France, such as:

- The struggle against nature and society
- Life and death in the peasant village
- Scarcity and insecurity in agrarian life
- A source of peasant strength; the village community
- Peasant protests and popular uprisings
- The peasant revolution of 1789.

== Downfall ==
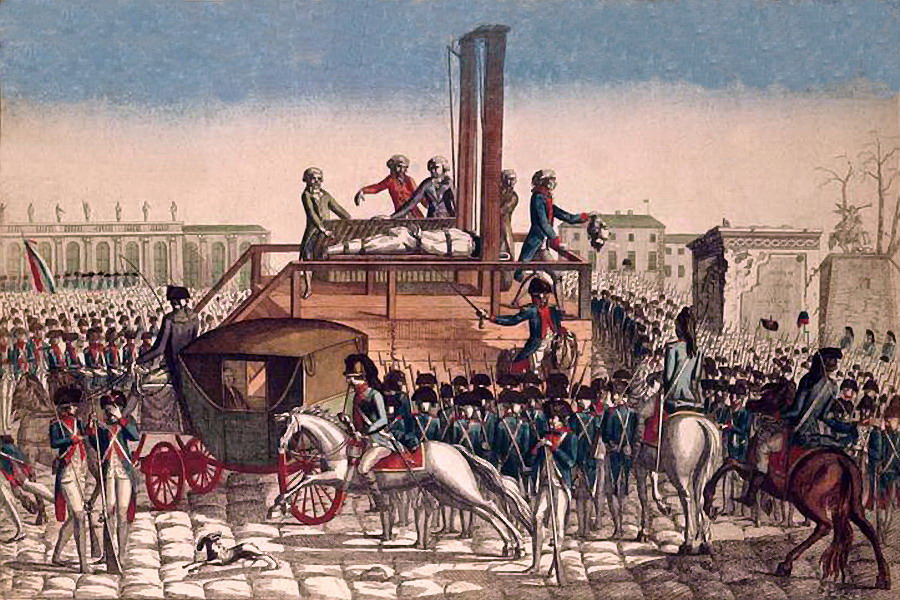
One of the assistants of Charles Henri Sanson shows the head of Louis XVI.

In 1789, the ancien régime was violently overthrown by the French Revolution. Long among of the richest and most powerful nations of Europe, France had serious economic difficulties in 1785. The French people also enjoyed more political freedom and a lower incidence of arbitrary punishment than many of their fellow Europeans.

However, Louis XVI, his ministers, and the widespread French nobility had become immensely unpopular because the peasants and, to a lesser extent, the bourgeoisie were burdened with ruinously high taxes, which were levied to support wealthy aristocrats and their sumptuous lifestyles.

Historians explain the sudden collapse of the ancien régime as stemming in part from its rigidity. Aristocrats were confronted by the rising ambitions of merchants, tradesmen and prosperous farmers allied with aggrieved peasants, wage-earners and intellectuals influenced by the ideas of Enlightenment philosophers. As the revolution proceeded, power devolved from the monarchy and privileged-by-birth to more representative political bodies, like legislative assemblies, but conflicts among formerly allied republican groups caused considerable discord and bloodshed.

A growing number of French people had absorbed the ideas of "equality" and "freedom of the individual" as presented by Voltaire, Diderot, Turgot, and other philosophers and social theorists of the Enlightenment. The American Revolution had demonstrated that Enlightenment ideas about the organisation of governance could actually be put into practice. Some American diplomats, like Benjamin Franklin and Thomas Jefferson, had lived in Paris and consorted freely with members of the French intellectual class there. Furthermore, contact between American revolutionaries and the French soldiers, who had provided aid to the Continental Army in North America during the American Revolutionary War, helped to spread revolutionary ideals in France.

After a time, many people in France began to attack the democratic deficit of their own government, push for freedom of speech, challenge the Roman Catholic Church and decry the prerogatives of the nobles.

The revolution was caused by not a single event but a series of events that together irreversibly changed the organisation of political power, the nature of society and the exercise of individual freedoms.

== Nostalgia ==
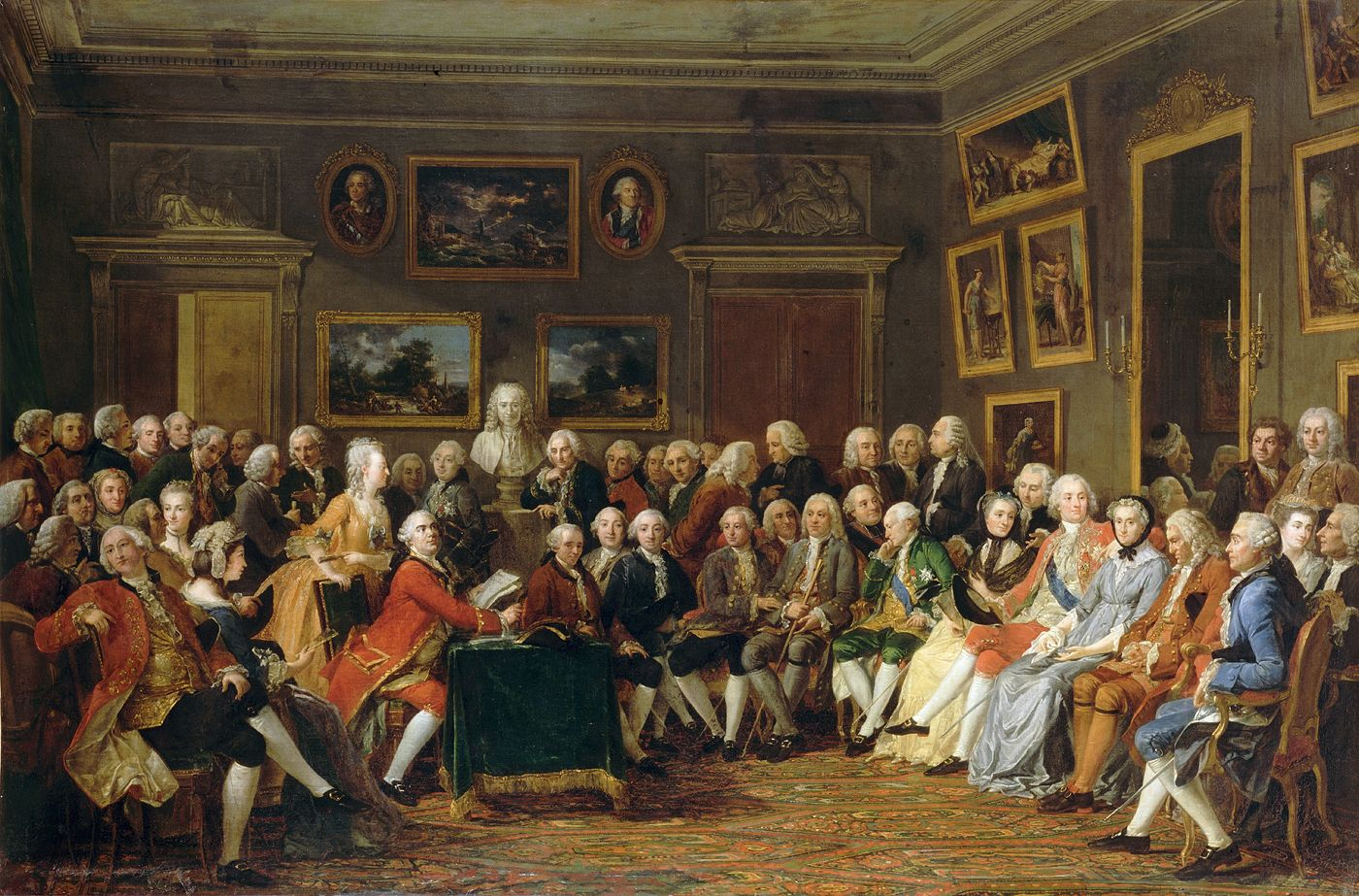
In the Salon of Madame Geoffrin in 1755 by Anicet Charles Gabriel Lemonnier. The painting, produced in 1812, represented a nostalgic view of the Enlightenment elite of the Ancien régime.

For some observers, the term came to denote a certain nostalgia. For example, Charles de Talleyrand famously quipped:

Celui qui n'a pas vécu au dix-huitième siècle avant la Révolution ne connaît pas la douceur de vivre: (Note: "Celui qui n'a pas vécu au dix-huitième siècle avant la Révolution ne connaît pas la douceur de vivre et ne peut imaginer ce qu'il peut y avoir de bonheur dans la vie. C'est le siècle qui a forgé toutes les armes victorieuses contre cet insaisissable adversaire qu'on appelle l'ennui. L'Amour, la Poésie, la Musique, le Théâtre, la Peinture, l'Architecture, la Cour, les Salons, les Parcs et les Jardins, la Gastronomie, les Lettres, les Arts, les Sciences, tout concourait à la satisfaction des appétits physiques, intellectuels et même moraux, au raffinement de toutes les voluptés, de toutes les élégances et de tous les plaisirs. L'existence était si bien remplie qui si le dix-septième siècle a été le Grand Siècle des gloires, le dix-huitième a été celui des indigestions." Charles-Maurice de Talleyrand-Périgord: Mémoires du Prince de Talleyrand: La Confession de Talleyrand, V. 1-5 Chapter: La jeunesse – Le cercle de Madame du Barry.) ("He who has not lived in the eighteenth century before the Revolution does not know the sweetness of living.")

That affection was caused by the perceived decline in culture and values after the revolution, in which the aristocracy lost much of its economic and political power to what was seen as a rich, coarse and materialistic bourgeoisie. The theme recurs throughout 19th-century French literature, with Honoré de Balzac and Gustave Flaubert alike attacking the mores of the new upper classes. To that mindset, the ancien régime had expressed a bygone era of refinement and grace before the revolution and its associated changes ushered in a crude uncertain modernity.

The historian Alexis de Tocqueville argued against that defining narrative in his classic study L'Ancien Régime et la Révolution, which highlighted the continuities in French institutions before and after the revolution.

== See also ==
- France in the early modern period
- Censorship in the Ancien Régime
- Fundamental laws of the Kingdom of France
- French forestry ordinance of 1669
- History of the French Navy from 1715 to 1789

== Notes ==
Preceded by Hundred Years' War	French periods of history 1453–1789	Succeeded by Revolutionary Period
