= L'amant anonyme =

1780 opera by Chevalier de Saint-Georges

- Opera by Chevalier de Saint-Georges
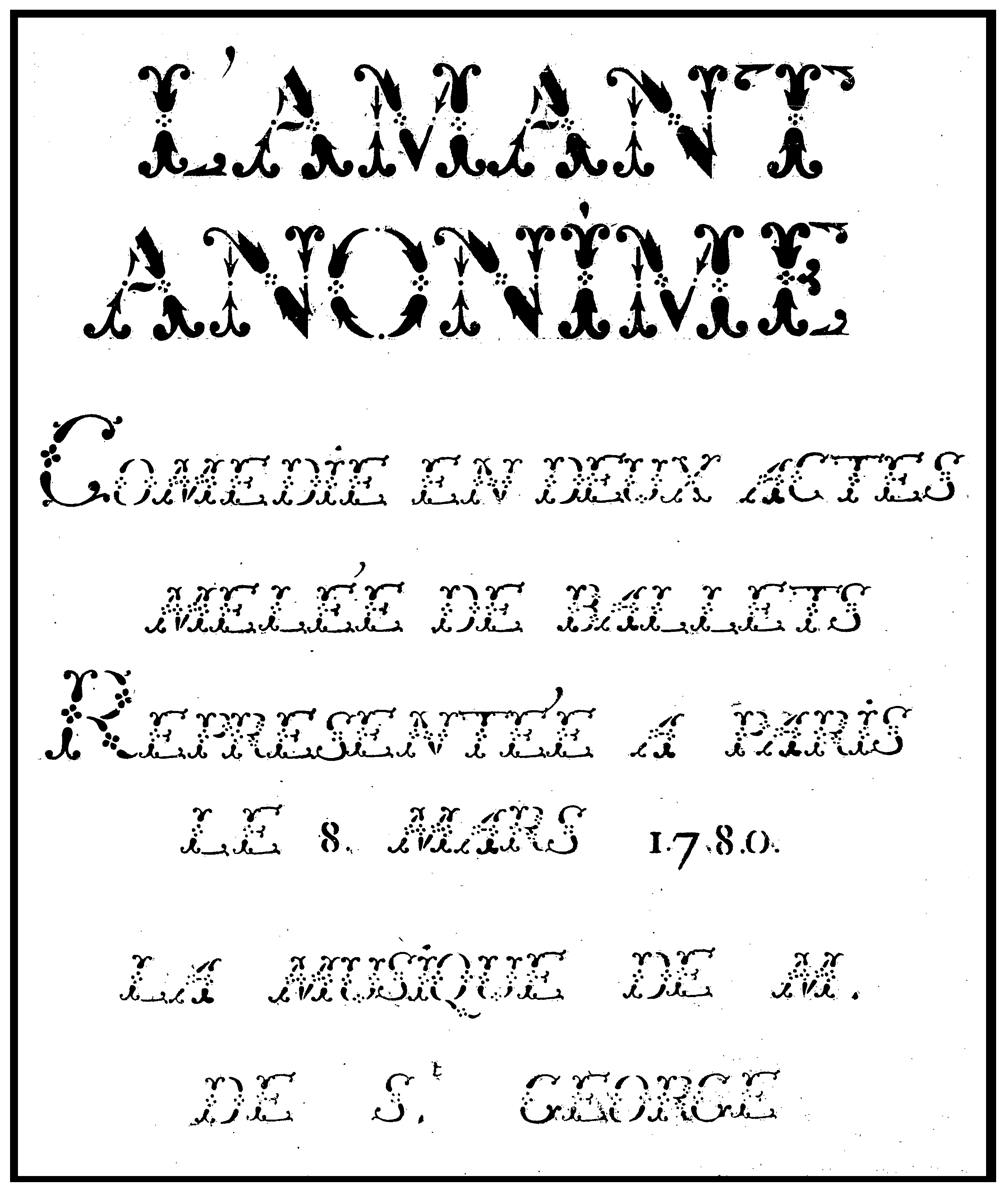
- Title page of manuscript, Paris 1780
- Librettist: Desfontaines-Lavallée
- Language: French
- Based on: A play by Madame de Genlis
- Premiere: 18 March 1780; Private theater of Madame de Montesson

L'amant anonyme (The Anonymous Lover) is a 1780 opéra comique in two acts with ballet by Joseph Bologne, Chevalier de Saint-Georges to a libretto by Desfontaines-Lavallée based on a play by Madame de Genlis. L'amant is Saint-Georges' sole surviving opera.

A reproduction of the manuscript score of this opera was published in 1984. A critical edition of the score was published in 2020. A freely accessible critical edition of the score is also available through the Festival International de Musique Saint-Georges.

== Plot ==
The story concerns a wealthy young widow, Leontine, who resists suggestions that she fall in love again after a cold marriage to her late husband. She has been receiving gifts and love letters from an anonymous admirer, who is in actuality her good friend Valcour. Valcour, however, is of lower birth and is afraid Leontine could never love him. So he hides his feelings and tells her that he also is closed to love. Still, he clumsily tries to reveal himself through mutual friends just as Leontine is trying to meet the Anonymous Lover herself. Eventually all is revealed and they give themselves to love.

== Roles ==
Roles, voice types, premiere cast
Role	Voice type
Léontine, a young widow	soprano
Valcour, the anonymous lover	tenor
Ophémon, Léontine's tutor	baritone
Jeannette, bride and friend of Léontine	soprano
Colin, groom and friend of Léontine	tenor
Dorothée, Léontine’s close friend	spoken role
Wedding guests, chorus

== Performance history ==
L'amant anonyme was premiered in March 1780 in Paris at the private theater of Madame de Montesson.

It was revived by conductor Marlon Daniel, a leading authority on the life and music of Joseph Bologne, and the Artistic and Music Director of the Festival International de Musique Saint-Georges. In 2016 he led the American premiere of the complete work, taking place at the Charleston Gaillard Center in South Carolina, marking the first time the opera had been performed in its entirety, 236 years after it was composed. The performance featured French soprano Magali Léger in the leading role of Léontine and Cuban-American tenor Everette Shuttle as Valcour, the titular “Anonymous Lover." The edition was prepared from manuscripts by ArtistWorld Publishing.

Opera Philadelphia staged its company premiere of L'amant anonyme at the Academy of Music on January 31 and February 2, 2025, as a co-production with Boston Lyric Opera.

== Recording ==
- Joseph Bologne, Saint-Georges: L'amant anonyme "world premiere recording", with Nicole Cabell (Léontine), Geoffrey Agpalo (Valcour), David Govertsen (Ophémon), Erica Schuller (Jeannette), Michael St. Peter (Colin), Nathalie Colas (Dorothée), Haymarket Opera Company (Chicago), conducted by Craig Trompeter. Çedille Records, 2023. Length: 2 hours, 49 minutes.
