= Coupe (surname) =

Coupe or Coupé is a surname, and may refer to:

- Brandon Coupe (born 1972), American tennis player and coach
- Cyriel Paul Coupé, pseudonym Anton van Wilderode, Belgian diocesan priest, teacher, writer and poet
- Dan Coupe (1885–1952), English footballer
- Eliza Coupe, American actress, comedian, and model
- Jean-Marie-Louis Coupé (1732–1818), French abbé and librarian
- Mike Coupe (born 1960), British businessman
- Sheila Vogel-Coupe (1929–2022), English escort, oldest prostitute in the United Kingdom
- Stuart Coupe, Australian music journalist and band manager
- Thomas Coupe (c.1818–1875), Canadian ship's captain
- William Barrington-Coupe (1931–2014), Welsh record producer

== See also ==
- Couper
- Coope
