= L'amant statue =

- Opera by Nicolas Dalayrac
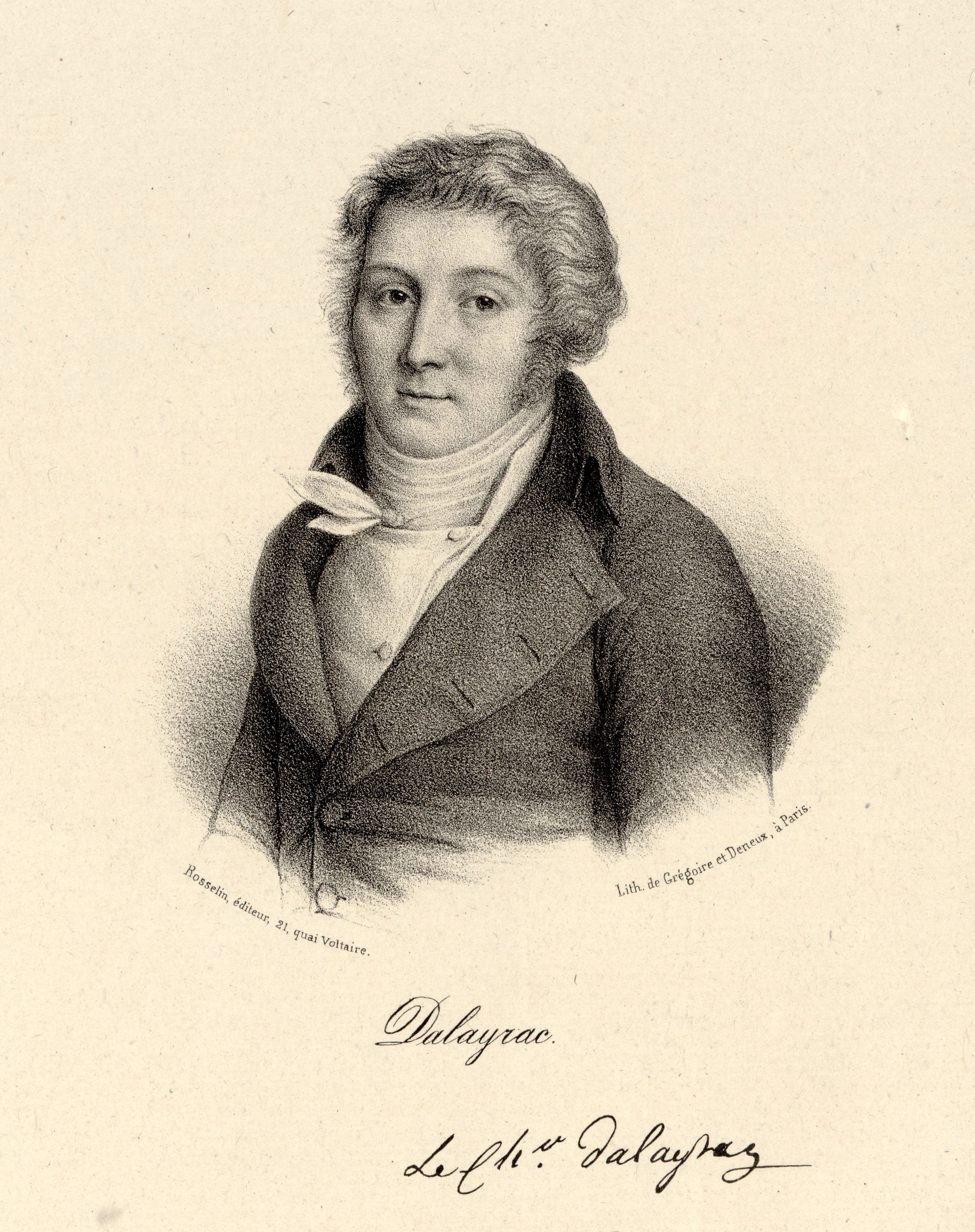
- Nicolas Dalayrac
- Librettist: Desfontaines-Lavallée
- Language: French
- Premiere: 4 August 1785; Comédie-Italienne, Paris

L'amant statue is an opera in one act by composer Nicolas Dalayrac with a French libretto by Desfontaines-Lavallée. The opera was premiered by the Comédie-Italienne at the first Salle Favart in Paris on 4 August 1785. It was revived on 30 September 1802 at the Salle Feydeau.

== Roles ==
Roles, voice types, premiere cast
Role	Voice type	Premiere cast: 4 August 1785
Célimène	soprano	Rose Renaud
Rosette	soprano	Marie Desbrosses
Dorval	taille (baritenor)	Louis Michu
Frontin	basse-taille (bass-baritone)	Philippe-Thomas Meunier (also spelled Ménier)

== Discography ==
- L'amant statue with conductor Michael Cook and the Orchestre du Festival de Saint-Céré. Cast includes: Elisabeth Duval (Célimène), Jean-Pierre Chevalier (Dorval), Florence Launay (Rosette), and Francis Dudziak (Frontin). Recorded live on August 8, 1985. Released on the Ariane-Scalen label.
