= Pierre-Yves Barré =

French vaudevillist and songwriter

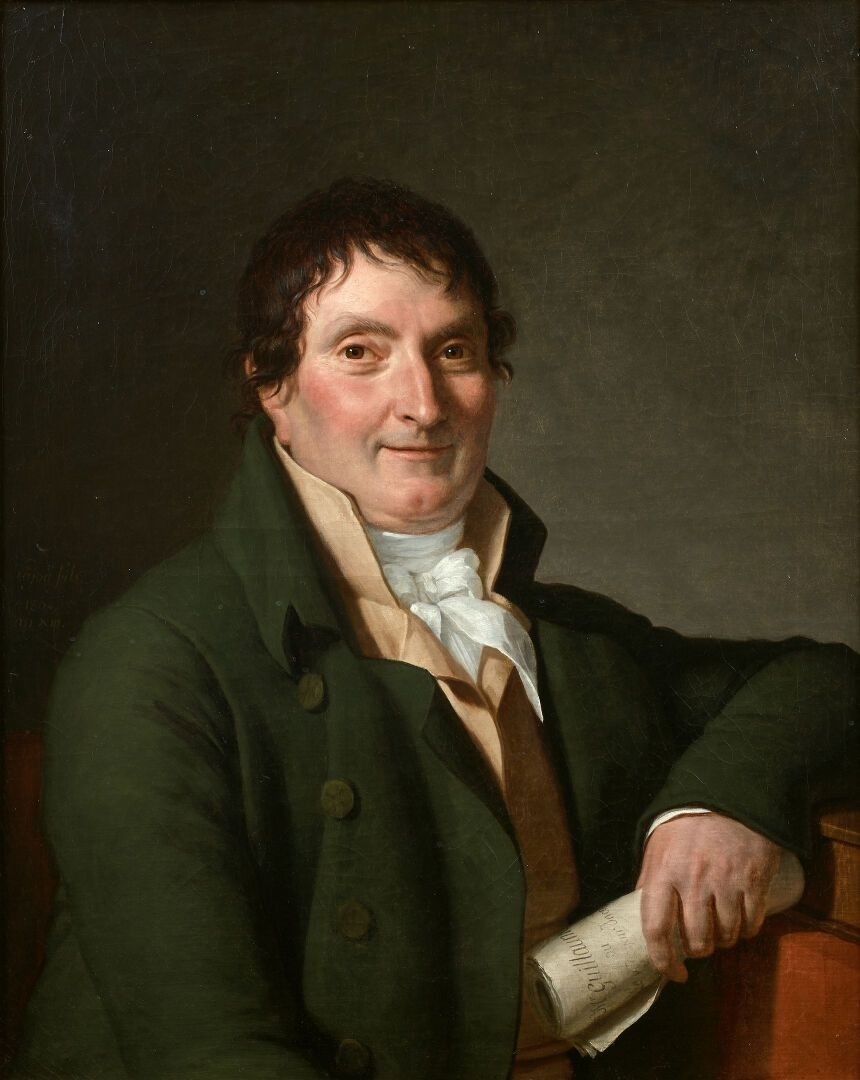
Portrait of Pierre-Yves Barré, 1804, by Jacques-Augustin-Catherine Pajou

Pierre-Yves Barré (French pronunciation: [pjɛʁ iv baʁe]; 17 April 1749 – 2 May 1832) was a French vaudevillist and songwriter.

== Life ==
Barré was born in Paris. He began life as a lawyer to the French parliament, then court clerk in Pau, but as the nephew of the chansonnier Pierre Laujon moved more and more towards a life in the theatre. With Piis, Jean-Baptiste Radet and Desfontaines-Lavallée, in 1792 he founded the théâtre du Vaudeville (which he headed until 1815, replaced by Marc-Antoine Désaugiers), then on rue de Chartres-Saint-Honoré. Bonaparte was at first "discontented with his theatre due to anti-Republican allusions which he made every evening" but in 1805 commanded him to go to Boulogne-sur-Mer to entertain the officers of the invasion force against England. He died in Paris.

== Works ==
- Cassandre, 1780.
- Arlequin aficheur.
- Mr. Guillaume ou le voyageur inconnu, 1800.
- Lantara ou le peintre au cabaret, 1809
