= Jean-Baptiste Radet =

French vaudevillist

Jean-Baptiste Radet (20 January 1752 in Dijon – 17 March 1830 in Paris) was a French vaudevillist.

Prior to the French Revolution, he worked in the library of the duchesse de Villeroy, allowing him to indulge his literary tastes. He had already had success with several plays at the Théâtre de l'Ambigu-Comique and Théâtre-Italien (Opéra-Comique), when he founded the Théâtre du Vaudeville with his friend Pierre-Yves Barré. Notable among his plays are :

- Renaud d'Ast (1787)
- La Chaste Suzanne (1793)
- Gaspard l'avisé
- La Maison en loterie.

== Sources ==
- Bouillet, Marie-Nicolas; Chassang, Alexis, eds. (1878). "Radet (J. B)". Dictionnaire Bouillet (in French). Vol. 3. p. 1577.
