= Jean-Marie-Louis Coupé =

French abbé and librarian (1732–1818)

- Born: 18 October 1732; Péronne, Somme, France
- Died: 10 May 1818 (aged 85); Paris, France
- Occupation: Librarian

Jean-Marie-Louis Coupé (18 October 1732 – 10 May 1818) was a French abbé, man of letters and librarian.

== Biography ==
He studied in Paris and was ordained a priest and taught rhetorics at the College of Navarre. He then became tutor to the Prince of Vaudemont, son of the Countess de Brionne, with whom he traveled to Germany, Italy and Switzerland. He published several moral and literary works, including the periodical collections of mélanges and literary varieties. He was appointed a royal censor in 1778 and custodian of the titles and genealogies department of the Bibliothèque du roi in 1785. After the fall of Robespierre in 1792, he retired in Fontainebleau and managed to earn a living by making translations of Greek and Latin authors for booksellers. He became honorary censor after the Bourbon Restauration.

== Publications ==
- 1772: Manuel de morale, dédié à Monseigneur le comte d'Artois
- 1773: Dictionnaire des mœurs
- 1785–1787: Variétés littéraires, historiques, galantes, etc., 8 vol.
- 1779–1781: Histoire universelle des théâtres de toutes les nations, depuis Thespis jusqu'à nos jours, with Desfontaines-Lavallée, Testu et Le Fuel de Méricourt, 13 vol.
- 1795–1799: Les Soirées littéraires, ou Mélanges de traductions nouvelles des plus beaux morceaux de l'antiquité, de pièces instructives et amusantes, françaises et étrangères, 10 vol.
- 1801–1802: Spicilège de littérature ancienne ou moderne, ou Recueil d'ouvrages grecs et latins de tous les âges et de tous les genres ignorés ou peu connus, 2 vol.

Translations

- 1778: Michel de L'Hospital : Essai de traduction de quelques épîtres et autres poésies latines de Michel de L'Hôpital, avec des éclaircissements sur sa vie et son caractère, 2 vol.
- 1795: Seneca the Younger : Théâtre de Sénèque. Traduction nouvelle, enrichie de notes historiques, littéraires et critiques, et suivie du texte latin corrigé d'après les meilleurs manuscrits, 2 vol.
- 1796: Daniel Heinsius : Éloge de l'âne,
- 1796: Homer : Opuscules, 2 vol.
- 1796: Theognis of Megara : Sentences. Poème moral de Proclyde

== Bibliography ==
- Pierre Larousse, Grand Dictionnaire universel du XIXe siècle, vol. V, 1869, p. 320
- Jean-Philippe Gérard et Thierry Sarmant, « Les gardes du département des Titres et généalogies et les employés attachés au Cabinet des titres. 1720 à 1883 », Bibliothèque nationale de France, 2005.
