= Pierre-Antoine-Augustin de Piis =

French writer (1755–1832)

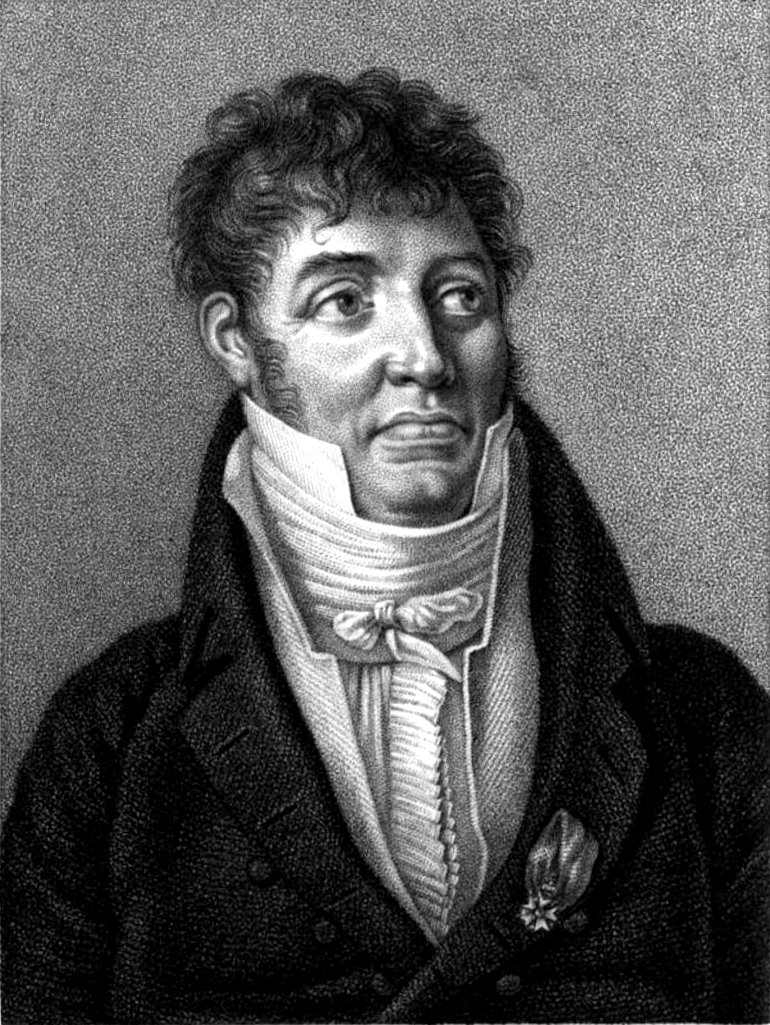
- Piis painted by Lagrenée in 1810 (Musée de la Révolution française).
- Born: 17 September 1755; Paris, France
- Died: 22 May 1832 (aged 76); Paris, France
- Occupations: Man of letters, playwright
- Writing career
- Notable works: Les Solitaires de Normandie, le Savetier et le Financier

Pierre-Antoine-Augustin (17 September 1755, Paris – 22 May 1832, Paris), chevalier de Piis was a French dramatist and man of letters.

== Life and career ==
With Pierre-Yves Barré he was one of the co-founders of Paris's Théâtre du Vaudeville.

In 1794, he wrote the song, "La Liberté des Nègres", which celebrated the abolition of slavery by the French National Convention.

He was the son of Pierre-Joseph de Piis, chevalier de Saint-Louis and major to the Cap Français, and as such was intended for service in France's colonial army. However, due to his delicate health, he gave up the military and completed at the collège d'Harcourt the studies he had begun at the Lycée Louis-le-Grand.

== Sources ==
- Ferdinand Hoefer, Nouvelle biographie générale, t. 40, Paris, Firmin Didot, frères, 1862, p. 226-7.
- Louis Gustave Vapereau, Dictionnaire universel des littératures, Paris, Hachette, 1876, p. 1600

== See also ==
- List of French writers
- List of playwrights
- List of songwriters
