= Mozin =

Mozin may refer to:

- Aleksandr Mozin (born 1961), Russian speed skater
- Benoit Mozin (1769–1857), French composer
- Théodore Mozin (1818–1850), French composer
- Mozīn, a village in Sistan and Baluchestan Province, Iran

== See also ==
- Mözen, municipality in Germany
- Mosin (disambiguation)
