= Théodore Mozin =

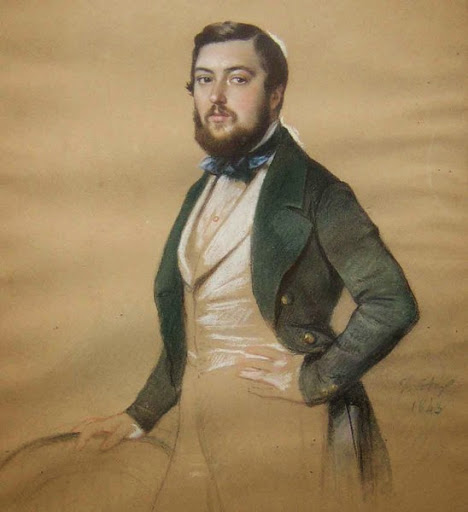
Theodore Désiré Mozin

Théodore Désiré Mozin (25 January 1818 – 16 November 1850) was a French composer.

== Life ==
Mozin was born in Paris into a family of musicians. As a child, Mozin received music lessons from his father Benoit Mozin (1769–1857), a pupil of François-Joseph Gossec, who had composed several piano works himself and had taught piano at the Conservatoire de Paris since its foundation in 1795. His uncle André Pierre was one of the first students admitted and also became a teacher. Theodore entered the Conservatoire and became a teacher and composer like his father and uncle before him.

Mozin completed his studies at the Conservatoire, where he studied counterpoint with Fromental Halévy, composition with Ferdinando Paër and Jean-François Lesueur, harmony with Victor Dourlen and piano with Pierre Zimmermann. After attending the composition classes of Halévy and Henri Montan Berton, he entered the Prix de Rome competition in 1841 and won the Second Grand Prix with the setting of the poem Lionel Foscari by Amédée-David de Pastoret.

On 27 February 1837, Mozin was appointed assistant professor of keyboard studies at the Conservatoire, while continuing his studies there. On 1 October 1848, Cherubini, then director of this establishment, appointed him professor of solfège.

On 18 February 1843, he married Marie Rose Adéone Fossé in Paris. He died at the age of 32 in 1850, and was buried at Montmartre Cemetery. His vault decorated with a portrait by Antoine Étex (a family friend) was vandalized and the marble medallion representing him was stolen.

== Works ==
- Lionel Foscari, cantata on a poem by Amédée-David, Marquis de Pastoret (subject of the competition for the Prix de Rome), 1841
- Brilliant variations on an original theme, Op. 2
- First prélude, Op. 10
- Six fantasies on 'La Sirène', Op. 11
- La Plainte du pâtre. Fantaisie brillante pour piano sur une mélodie Pang Morel, Op. 14
- Valses élégantes et brillantes, Op. 15
- Études spéciales, Op. 16
- Études de salon, Op. 17
- Souvenir de Trouville. Original varied quadrille for 4-handed piano, Op. 22 (Paris: E. Mayaud, 1850)
- 12 Special studies for small hands composed for piano, Op. 23
- Alma, brilliant polka composed for piano, Op. 25
- Le Sourire, Grande valse élégante, Op. 26
- L'Ange du réveil. Lyrics by Louis-Émile Vanderburch.
- Contredanses followed by a waltz for piano forte
- Le Dernier vœu. Romance. Lyrics by Auguste Humbert (1843)
- Original Polka-mazurka composed for piano, Op. 54 (1851)

== Sources ==
- Constant Pierre: Le Conservatoire national de musique et déclamation (Paris: Imprimerie nationale, 1900) (biography p. 452, "dictionnaire des lauréats", p. 818)
- Site Musimem Prix de Rome
