= Benoit Mozin =

Benoit François Mozin called le jeune (the younger) (21 March 1769 – 1 December 1857) was a French composer.

== Life ==
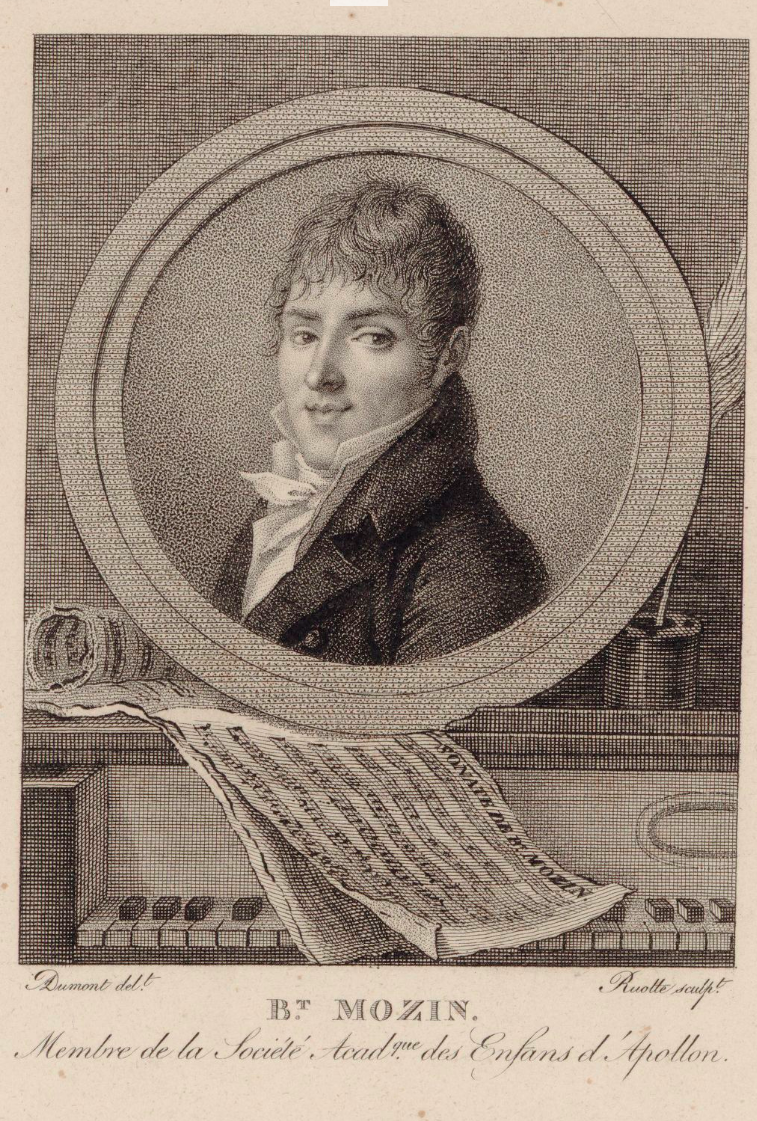
Benoit Mozin Portrait

Born in Paris, Mozin was first a pupil of François-Joseph Gossec, and then became a professor at the Conservatoire de Paris (until 1802), where Victor Dourlen was among his pupils. He later married the daughter of Louis Joseph Guichard, singing teacher, in his third marriage.

They had two children: the eldest, the marine painter Charles Mozin, discoverer of Trouville-sur-Mer, and his brother, the composer Théodore Mozin, second Grand Prix de Rome in musical composition in 1841 (a pupil of Henri-Montan Berton and Fromental Halévy).

Mozin was a member of the "Société académique des enfants d'Apollon" and of the Société du Caveau.

He left about 60 scores for the piano including Souvenir de Trouville, Op. 19, a title revived by his son Theodore (Quadrille, Op. 22).

After he died in 1857 in Sèvres, Mozin was buried at the cimetière du Père-Lachaise (8th division).

== Works (BnF) ==
- À l'auguste famille des Bourbon, romance sur des paroles de madame Mozin
- Les quatre saisons, musique italienne, composition by Guillaume André Villoteau with piano accompaniment by Benoit Mozin
- 6e pot-pourri d'airs connus pour le piano forte (1792)
- Concerto de Maestrino, arranged for harpsichord or forte piano
- Six romances avec accompagnement pour le forte piano (1796)
- Scene of the 1st act of Gluck's Alceste arranged for the forte piano (1800)
- Air del signor Biani, accompaniment by Mozin le jeune
- Les glouglous, chanson bachique on lyrics of (Béranger)
- Pour toi, romance, lyrics by M. de Segur jeune
- Les souvenirs, collection of contradances for the piano forte
- Un précepte d'Hippocrate, bacchanalian song (1822)
- Les adieux d'un cosaque, fantasy for the piano forte dedicated to S.A. Monseigneur Alexandre prince of Kourakin (Alexander Kurakin)
- Le retour du carnaval, contradanses and walzes
- Souvenir de Trouville, galop en rondo for piano Op.19
- Sonata Op.12
- 3rd collection of romances with accompaniment for the piano forte (1799)
- 3 sonatas for the piano forte (1798)

== Sources ==
- Constant Pierre: Le Conservatoire national de musique et déclamation, Paris 1900, Imprimerie nationale
