= Mosin (disambiguation) =

Mosin may refer to:

== People ==
- Lev Mosin (1992–), a Russian sprinter
- Sergei Ivanovich Mosin (1849–1902), a Russian military officer, engineer, and a designer of the Mosin–Nagant rifle
- Vasily Mosin, (1972–), a Russian sport shooter who specializes in the double trap

== Other ==
- The Mosin language, spoken in Vanua Lava Island in Vanuatu
- The Mosin–Nagant, a rifle developed by the Imperial Russian Army in 1882–91

- The 7.62 Tkiv 85, a Finnish modification of the Mosin–Nagant to be a designated marksman/sniper rifle
- The Karabinek wz. 91/98/23, a Polish modification of the Mosin rifle to carbine form

== See also ==
- Mossin, a surname
- Mozin (disambiguation)
