= Hôtel de Ville, Sèvres =

Town hall in Sèvres, France

Hôtel de Ville
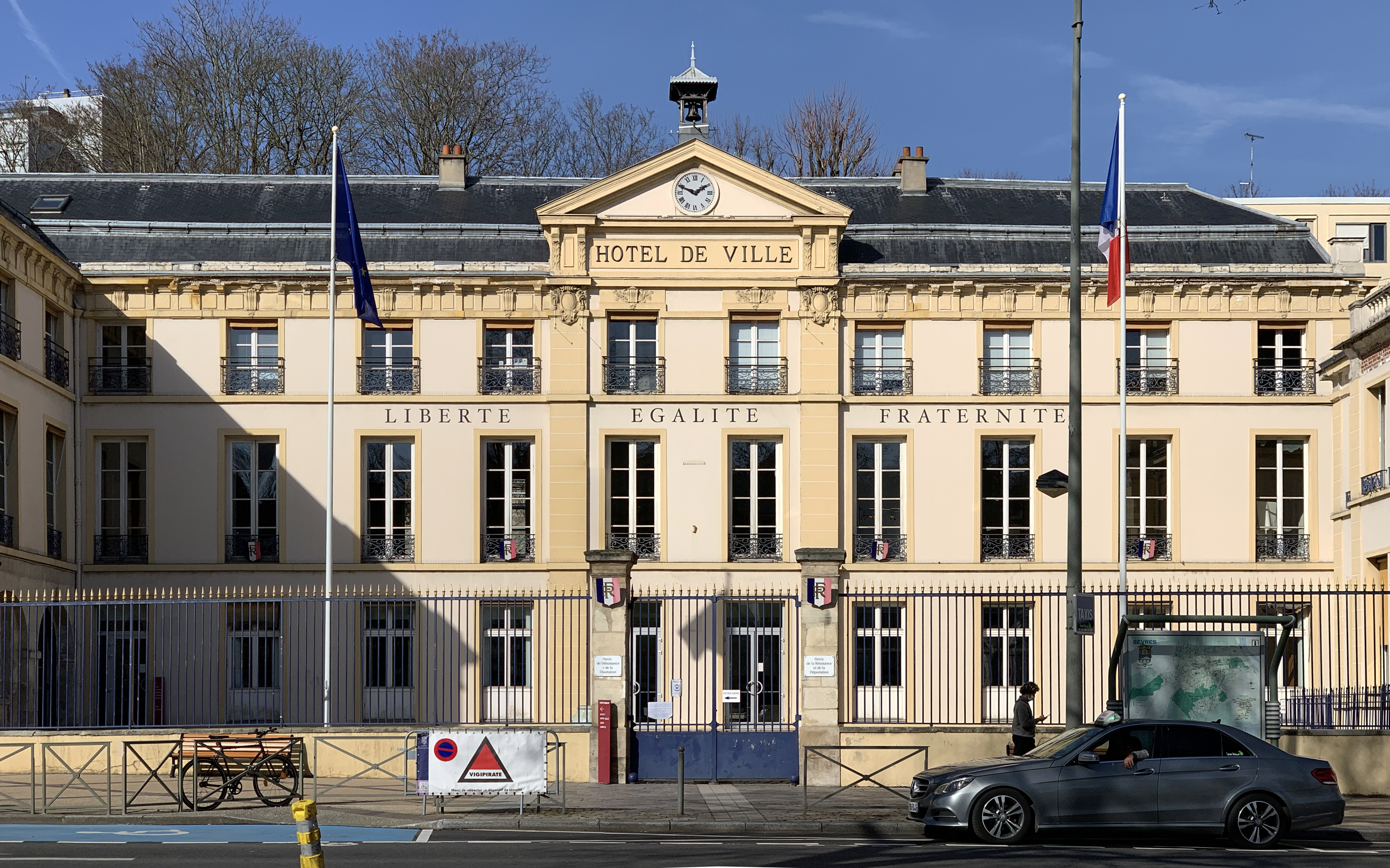
- The main frontage of the Hôtel de Ville in February 2021
- Interactive map of the Hôtel de Ville area

General information
- Type: City hall
- Architectural style: Neoclassical style
- Location: Sèvres, France
- Coordinates: 48.8247°N 2.2124°E
- Completed: 1630

The Hôtel de Ville (French pronunciation: [otɛl də vil], City Hall) is a municipal building in Sèvres, Hauts-de-Seine, in the southwestern suburbs of Paris, standing on Grande Rue. It has been included on the Inventaire général des monuments by the French Ministry of Culture since 1986.

== History ==
Following the French Revolution, the new town council originally met in the clergy house adjacent to the Church of Saint-Romain-de-Blaye. The council later relocated to No. 11 Place Royale and then to a building on the corner of Rue des Caves and Grande Rue. This arrangement continued until 1834 when the council decided to acquire a more substantial property. The building they selected was Hôtel de Brancas on the north side of Grande Rue. The building had been commissioned by a nobleman, René Peyrat, who was secretary to the military leader Louis, Grand Condé, in the early 17th century. Originally known as Hôtel de Courchamp, it was designed in the neoclassical style, built in ashlar stone and was completed in around 1630.

The design originally involved a main block facing onto the street and a west wing, which was projected forward. After the Grand Condé joined the rebel forces during the Fronde and was exiled to Spain, Peyrat fell from grace and, in 1647, he was forced to sell the house to Pierre Monnerot, who was an advisor to Louis XIV and consultant to Superintendent of Finances, Nicolas Fouquet. Monnerot expanded the site by purchasing adjacent properties to create gardens and water features. However, after Fouquet also fell from grace in 1661, Monnerot was arrested and sent to the Bastille, and his property was seized by Louis XIV. The king gave the house to his own brother, Philippe I, Duke of Orléans. It became known as the Hôtel de Brancas a century later after the House of Orléans briefly rented it out to Louis II de Brancas, 1st Duke of Lauraguais between 1792 and 1793.

Following the French Revolution, the house was seized by the state and then sold to the chemist, Armand Séguin, who had a contract to manufacture shoes and other leather products for the armies of Napoleon. After the Battle of Waterloo, the house was occupied by Prussian troops and was in a dilapidated state by the time it was acquired by the town council in 1834. The building was refurbished and several of the rooms were then converted to create the Salle du Conseil (council chamber) and the Salle des Mariages (wedding room). The council expanded the building, by creating an east wing, which initially served as a post office, in 1904.

Works of art in the town hall include the Fulvy Vase which commemorates the life of Jean-Louis Henry Orry de Fulvy, who founded the Manufacture nationale de Sèvres in 1740, as well as four other vases which formed part of a set which were manufactured as gifts to the countries which sent representatives to the Metre Convention in 1875. There are also a series of watercolours depicting local scenes by the painter, Alain Azémar.
