= Mossin =

Mossin is a surname. Notable people with the surname include:

- Addold Mossin (1919–2024), Estonian neopaganist and political activist
- Ib Mossin (1933–2004), Danish actor, singer and director
- Jan Mossin (1936–1987), Norwegian economist

== See also ==
- Mosin (disambiguation)
- Mössin, alternative name for Mosina, Stargard County, Poland
