= Sèvres =

- Commune
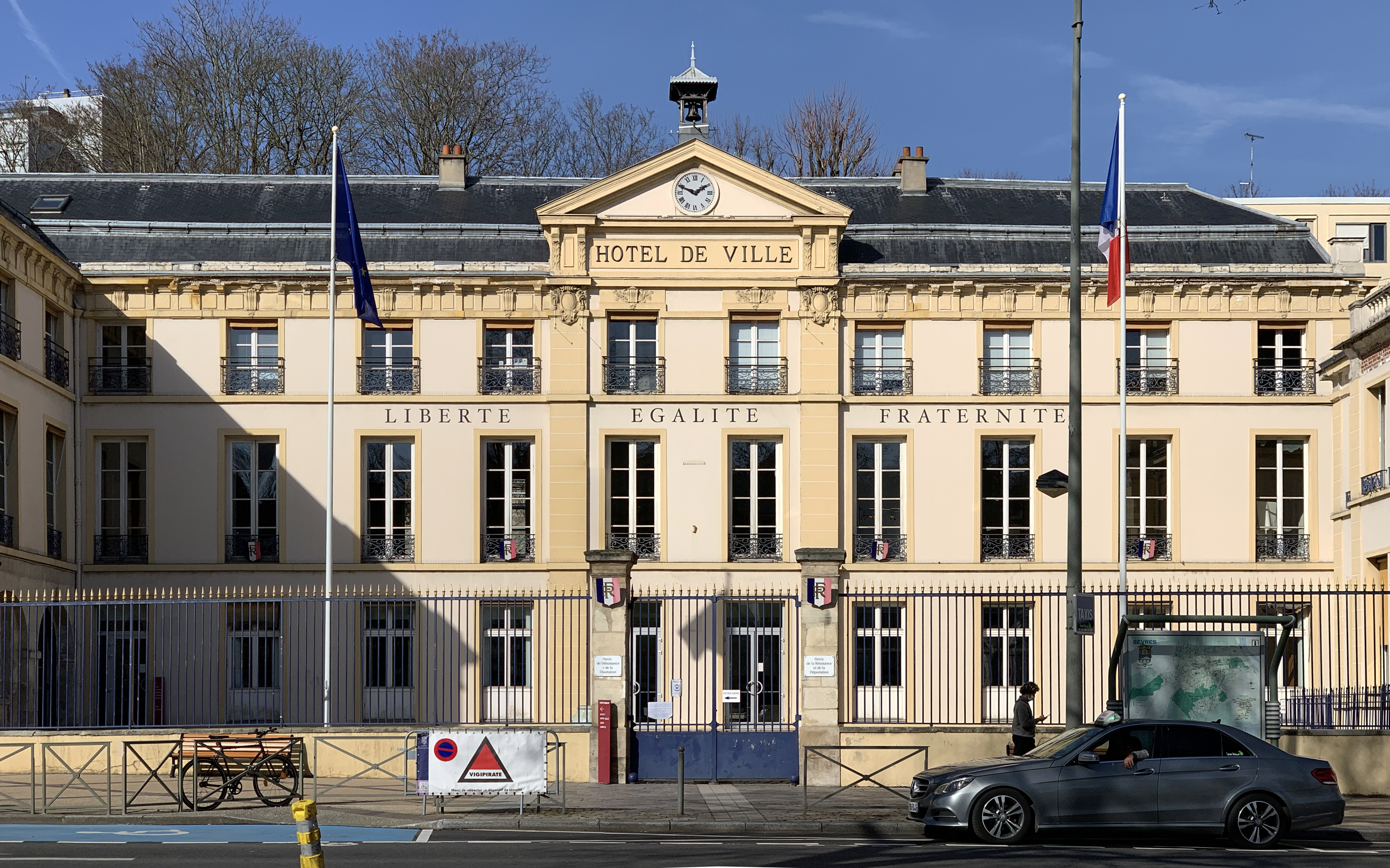
- The Hôtel de Ville

- Coat of arms

- Location (in red) within Paris inner suburbs
- Location of Sèvres
- Location within France Location within Île-de-France (region)
- Coordinates: 48°49′26″N 2°12′42″E
- Country: France
- Region: Île-de-France
- Department: Hauts-de-Seine
- Arrondissement: Boulogne-Billancourt
- Canton: Boulogne-Billancourt-2
- Intercommunality: Grand Paris

Government
  - Mayor (2026–32): Grégoire de La Roncière (DVD)
- Area^{1}: 3.91 km^{2} (1.51 sq mi)
- Highest elevation: 171 m (561 ft)
- Lowest elevation: 27 m (89 ft)
- Population (2023): 22,303
  - Density: 5,700/km^{2} (14,800/sq mi)
- Demonym: Sévrien
- Time zone: UTC+01:00 (CET)
  - Summer (DST): UTC+02:00 (CEST)
- INSEE/Postal code: 92072 /92310
- Website: www.sevres.fr
- ^{1} French Land Register data, which excludes lakes, ponds, glaciers > 1 km^{2} (0.386 sq mi or 247 acres) and river estuaries.

Sèvres (/ˈsɛvrə/, French: [sɛvʁ(ə)]) is a French commune in the southwestern suburbs of Paris. It is located 9.9 kilometres (6.2 miles) from the centre of Paris, in the Hauts-de-Seine department in the Île-de-France region. As of 2023, the population of the commune was 22,303. The commune is known for its famous porcelain production at the Manufacture nationale de Sèvres, which was also where the Treaty of Sèvres (1920) was signed.

== Geography ==
=== Location ===
Sèvres is a commune in the western suburbs of Paris, 10.3 km (6.4 mi) to the southwest of the centre of Paris, with an eastern edge by the river Seine. The commune borders Île Seguin, an island in the Seine, in the commune of Boulogne-Billancourt, adjoining Sèvres.

Situation of Sèvres

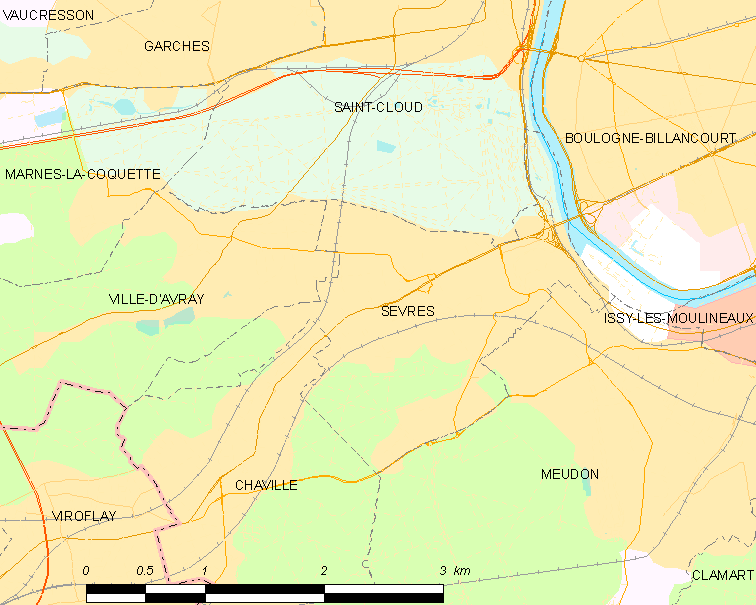
Map of the commune

View of the commune of Sèvres in red on the map of Paris and the "Petite Couronne"

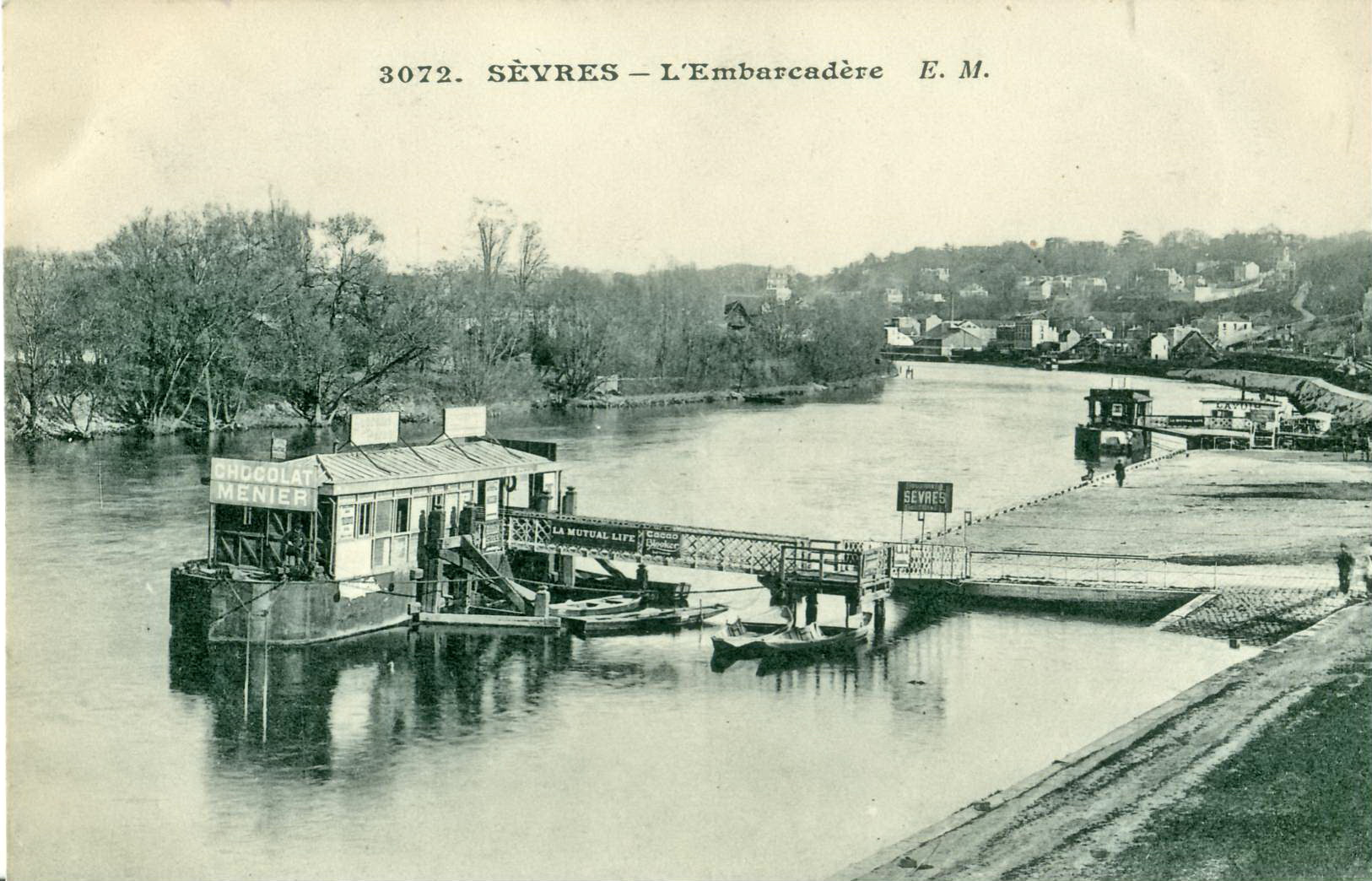
Banks of the Seine in the early 20th century. At that time, the river was an important transportation axis; river shuttles can be seen here as piers ensured the transportation of passengers to Paris.

=== Geology and landforms ===
The area of the commune is 391 hectares (970 acres). The altitude varies between 27–171 metres (89–561 ft).

Work at Sèvres, including for the construction of the expressway, permitted an update of interesting fossils in different geological layers. Notably, in chalk, some types of sea urchins, belemnite beaks, rhynchonellas and oysters were found; in the coarse limestone, ammonites.

=== Hydrography ===
- The Seine
- The Ru de Marivel which empties into the Seine 80 metres (262 feet) upstream of the Pont de Sèvres.

=== Climate ===
The climate of île-de-France is oceanic. The popular observation stations for meteorology at Sèvres are Orly Airport and Vélizy – Villacoublay Air Base.

The climate in the departments of the small Parisian crown is characterised by sunshine and relatively low precipitation. The following table allows a comparison of the Île-de-France climate with that of some large French cities:

Comparison of weather conditions
City	Sunshine (hrs/yr)	Rain (mm/yr)	Snow (days/yr)	Storm (days/yr)	Fog (days/yr)
National average	1973	770	14	22	40
Orly	1797	615	16	20	31
Paris	1661	637	12	18	10
Nice	2724	733	1	29	1
Strasbourg	1693	665	29	29	53
Brest	1605	1211	7	12	75

The following table shows the monthly averages of temperature and precipitation for the station of Orly collected over the period 1961–1990:

Climate data for île-de-France (station of Orly 1961–1990)
Month	Jan	Feb	Mar	Apr	May	Jun	Jul	Aug	Sep	Oct	Nov	Dec	Year
Mean daily maximum °C	5.8	7.5	10.7	14.2	18.1	21.5	24.0	23.8	20.9	15.9	9.8	6.6	14.9
Daily mean °C	3.3	4.4	6.8	9.8	13.5	16.7	18.9	18.6	16.0	11.9	6.8	4.1	10.9
Mean daily minimum °C	0.7	1.3	3.0	5.3	8.8	11.9	13.8	13.4	11.2	7.9	3.8	1.6	6.9
Average precipitation mm	51.9	44.8	50.8	46.6	57.8	50.5	50.1	46.5	52.0	53.2	58.1	53.1	615.4
Mean daily maximum °F	42.4	45.5	51.3	57.6	64.6	70.7	75.2	74.8	69.6	60.6	49.6	43.9	58.8
Daily mean °F	37.9	39.9	44.2	49.6	56.3	62.1	66.0	65.5	60.8	53.4	44.2	39.4	51.6
Mean daily minimum °F	33.3	34.3	37.4	41.5	47.8	53.4	56.8	56.1	52.2	46.2	38.8	34.9	44.4
Average precipitation inches	2.04	1.76	2.00	1.83	2.28	1.99	1.97	1.83	2.05	2.09	2.29	2.09	24.23
Average relative humidity (%)	86	80	76	72	72	71	70	71	77	83	86	86	78
Source: Infoclimat

Weather records in Île-de-France (Orly station 1961–1990)
Month	Jan	Feb	Mar	Apr	May	Jun	Jul	Aug	Sept	Oct	Nov	Dec
Number of days with frost	12.4	10.3	7.0	1.6	0.0	0.0	0.0	0.0	0.0	0.2	5.4	11.6
Source: Infoclimat

Climate data for île-de-France (station of Orly 1961–1990)
Month	Jan	Feb	Mar	Apr	May	Jun	Jul	Aug	Sep	Oct	Nov	Dec	Year
Record high °C	16.5	20.0	24.5	29.4	35.0	37.0	39.2	40.0	33.0	31.3	20.1	17.3	40.0
Record low °C	−16.8	−15.0	−9.4	−4.3	−1.3	3.2	6.7	5.6	1.7	3.9	−9.6	−13.3	−16.8
Record high °F	61.7	68.0	76.1	84.9	95.0	98.6	102.6	104.0	91.4	88.3	68.2	63.1	104.0
Record low °F	1.8	5.0	15.1	24.3	29.7	37.8	44.1	42.1	35.1	39.0	14.7	8.1	1.8
Source: JournalduNet

=== Routes of communication and transport ===
==== Roads ====
Sèvres is traversed from side to side by the RN 10, today downgraded and allowing connection of the city to Boulogne-Billancourt and Chaville. It is also the starting point of the RN 118 at the level of the Pont de Sèvres.

==== Cycle paths ====
Sèvres presents a main traffic artery which supports important transit traffic at morning and evening peak hours. This allows preservation of its secondary residential purpose from suffering the negative effects of through traffic, and on which the development zone 30 was under study, as early as 2007. The city hall has, however, launched a reconsideration on these routes for sharing public spaces in favour of soft links (comfortable pavements, if possible with the development of cycle paths) and the use of public transit where they pass (comfortable bus stops, creation of own sites where technical conditions permit). Since November 2011, fifteen streets have two-way cycle lanes. They are the subject of ground markings and installation of specific signaling panels:

- Avenue de la Cristallerie
- Rue Brancas, between the Rue de Ville-d'Avray and Rue Bernard-Palissy
- Grande Rue, between the Rue de Ville-d'Avray and the Place Gabriel-Péri
- Rue du Docteur Gabriel-Ledermann, between the Rue de Rueil and Rue Jules Sandeau
- Rue Riocreux, between Place Pierre-Brossolette and Rue de Ville d'Avray
- Rue Brongniart
- Rue Léon Journault (between Avenue Camille Sée and Sente Brézin) then Rue Victor-Hugo
- Rue des Bas-Tillets between Rue Benoît Malon and the Rue de la Garenne
- Rue Albert Dammouse, between Rue Avice and the Stade des Fontaines turn
- Rue Rouget-de-l'Isle
- Rue Jules-Ferry
- Rue du Docteur Roux
- Rue Charles-Vaillant
- Rue Jean-Jaurès
- Rue des Verrières

==== Public transport ====
Bus routes 169, 171, 179, and 426 of the RATP bus network, route 469 of the Établissement Transdev de Nanterre [Transdev establishment of Nanterre], route 45 in the Phébus bus network and at night by N61 and N145 of the Noctilien route network. The city makes one minibus available to people with reduced mobility, L'autre Bus [The Other Bus].

==== Rail ====
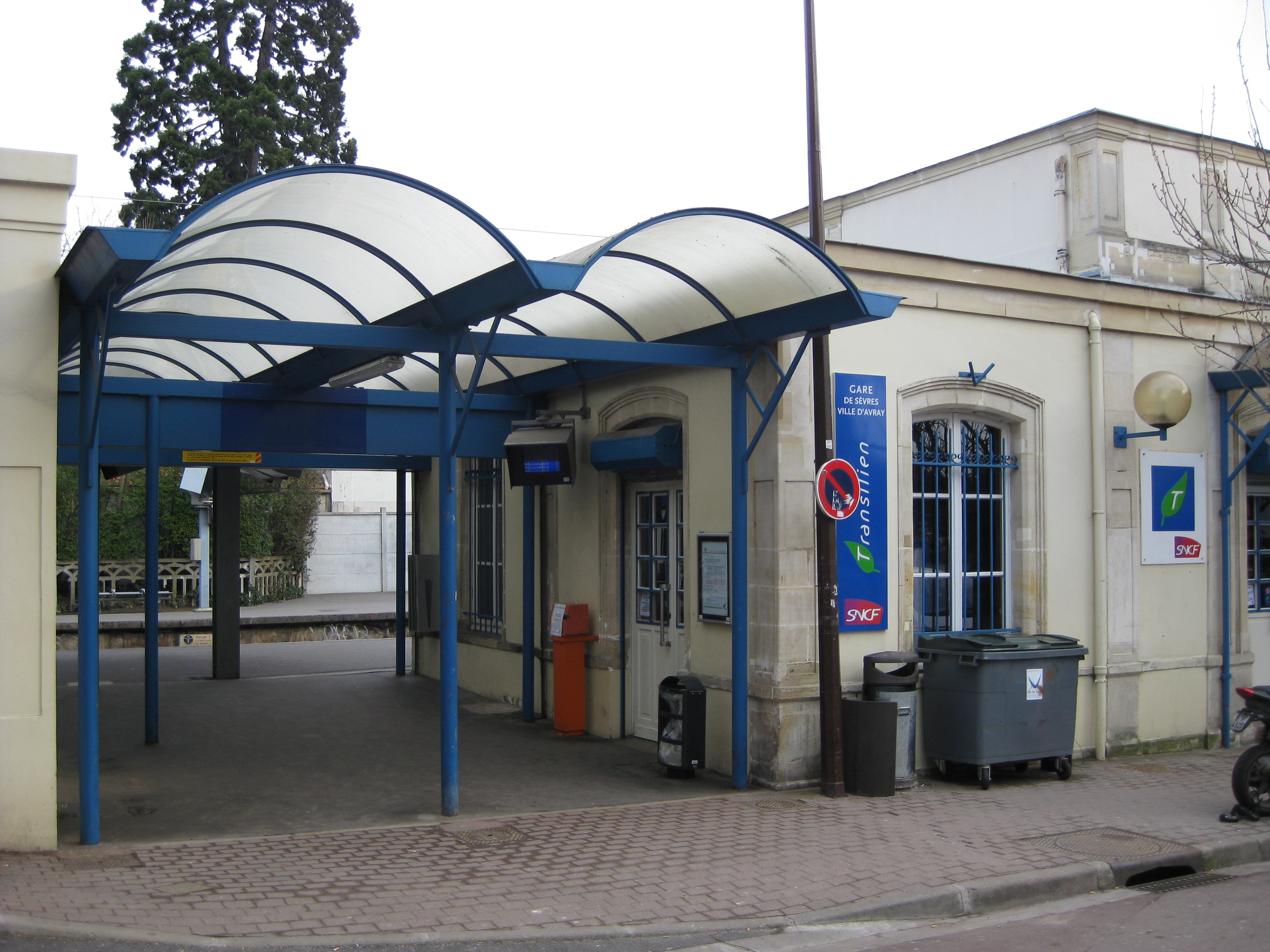
Sèvres–Ville d'Avray station

Sèvres is served by Sèvres-Rive-Gauche station on the Transilien Line N suburban rail line.

It is also served by Sèvres–Ville-d'Avray station on the Transilien Paris-Saint-Lazare suburban rail line.

It is also served by the Musée de Sèvres and Brimborion stations on Île-de-France tramway Line 2 which links Paris-Porte de Versailles and La Défense.

== Urbanism ==
=== Urban morphology ===
INSEE has divided the commune into ten islets grouped for statistical information.

The commune of Sèvres includes 16 quarters, named as follows:

- 1. Bruyères – Acacias – Fonceaux
- 2. Bruyères – Postillons – Jaurès
- 3. Val des Bruyères – Allard
- 4. Ernest Renan
- 5. Châtaigneraie
- 6. Beau Site – Pommerets
- 7. Binelles
- 8. Manufacture – Brimborion
- 9. SEL – Division Leclerc
- 10. Europe – Pierre Midrin
- 11. Médiathèque – 11 novembre
- 12. Danton – Gabriel Péri
- 13. Monesse
- 14. Croix-Bosset
- 15. Brancas – Fontenelles
- 16. Brancas – Beauregard

Land use in 2003
Type of occupation	Percentage	Area
Built urban space	62.70%	243.19 hectares (600.9 acres)
Unbuilt urban space	13.46%	52.21 hectares (129.0 acres)
Rural areas	23.83%	92.44 hectares (228.4 acres)
Source: IAURIF

=== Housing ===
In the project planning and sustainable development (PADD) approved 10 May 2007, the commune displays an ambition to maintain its population around its situation of early 2005. It has a commitment to offer every household in the commune the opportunity to live and grow in Sèvres, and a stake in preserving its fabric of facilities and local businesses. Studies conducted in the context of the PLH show that by 2015, this would involve the construction of approximately 40 homes per year (taking into account of the transformation of the former park, of the reduction of the vacancy rate and the loosening of household size) to maintain the communal population.

In 2005, the commune had 24.5% of its total as social housing. These homes are mostly located along the RD 910, around the city centre. The commune displays a desire to preserve this social mix by ensuring a diversity of different types of housing, under the framework of future construction operations. As such, it shows the will to maintain its social housing stock at around 25% of the total stock of main residences. On the other hand, private rental declined between 1990 and 1999. An effort in favour of this type of housing will be always sought in order to maintain the diversity of population profiles. Some areas of the city are poorly provided with social housing, and the development of this type of housing should allow a better balance across the commune.

=== Development projects ===
The main projects are:

- The reconstruction of the Croix Bosset school
- The development of links between the banks of the Seine, the city, parks and woodlands by pedestrian openings designed to develop a frame of soft east–west links. Such as linking Saint-Cloud Park / île Monsieur, between Brimborion Park and the Brimborion tram station, along the Seine, a development project of the entrance of Sèvres and the vicinity of the Museum of Manufacturing by the creation of a pedestrian/bicycle along the Grande Rue, behind the wall of the Museum.

== Toponymy ==
The name of the locality is attested as Savara in the 6th century, originating from the name of the stream which followed the Valley of Viroflay, Chaville, Sèvres. Then in the forms of Villa Savara in the 6th century, Saura, Saure, Savra, Saevara in the 11th century, Severa, Sepera and Separa in the 13th century, Sevra, Sièvre, Saives, Sèvre-en-France-lez-paris from the 14th century, before Sèvres.

Sèvres took the name of the river which ran through it. Sèvres includes radical sav-, sab-, in the sense of "hollow" or radical sam- "quiet". These radicals are often used in hydronymy.

The root is the same for the Sèvre Nantaise and the Sèvre Niortaise which gave its name to the Department of the Deux-Sèvres.

== History ==
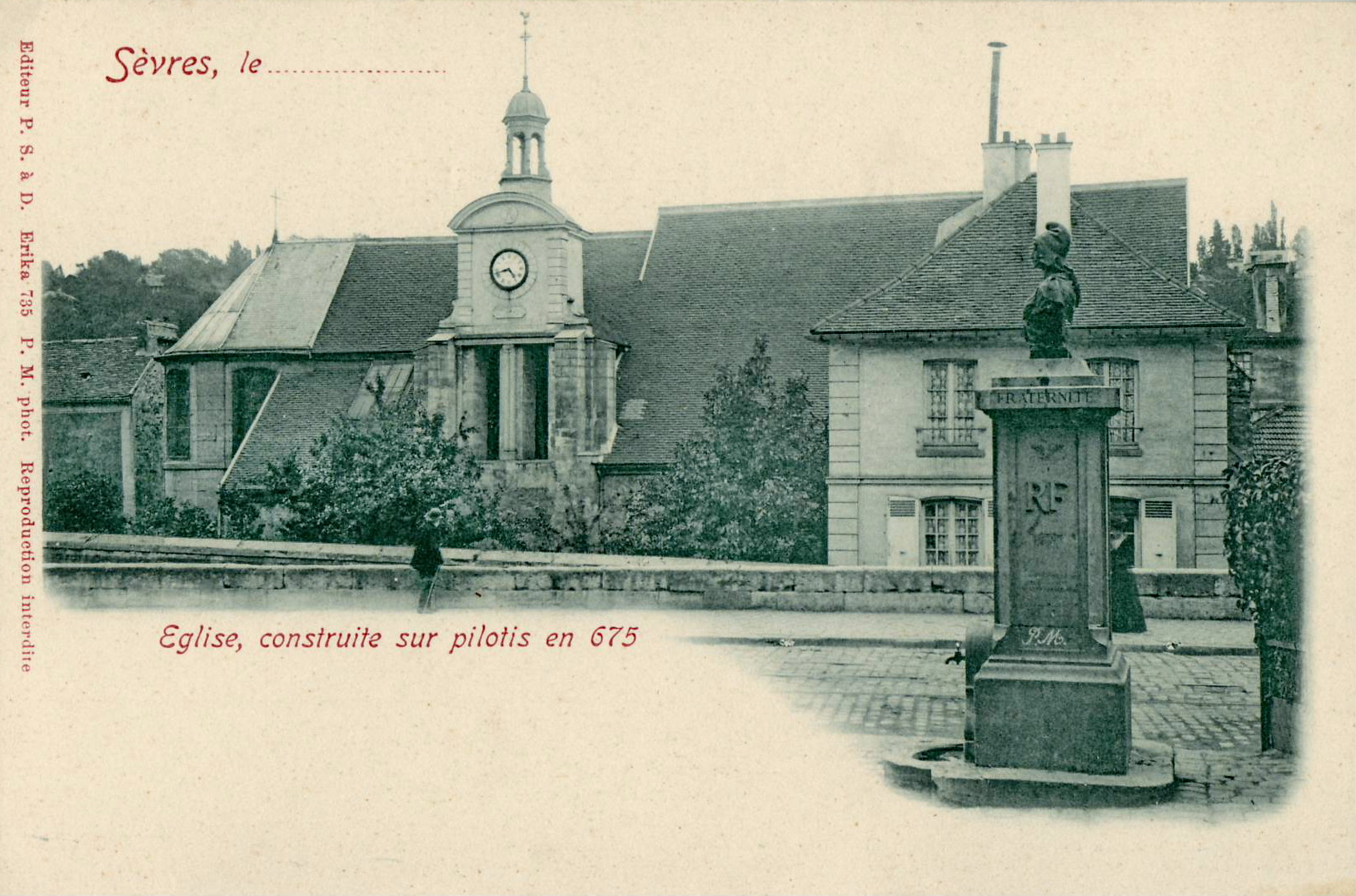
The Church of Saint-Romain-de-Blaye, at the start of the 20th century

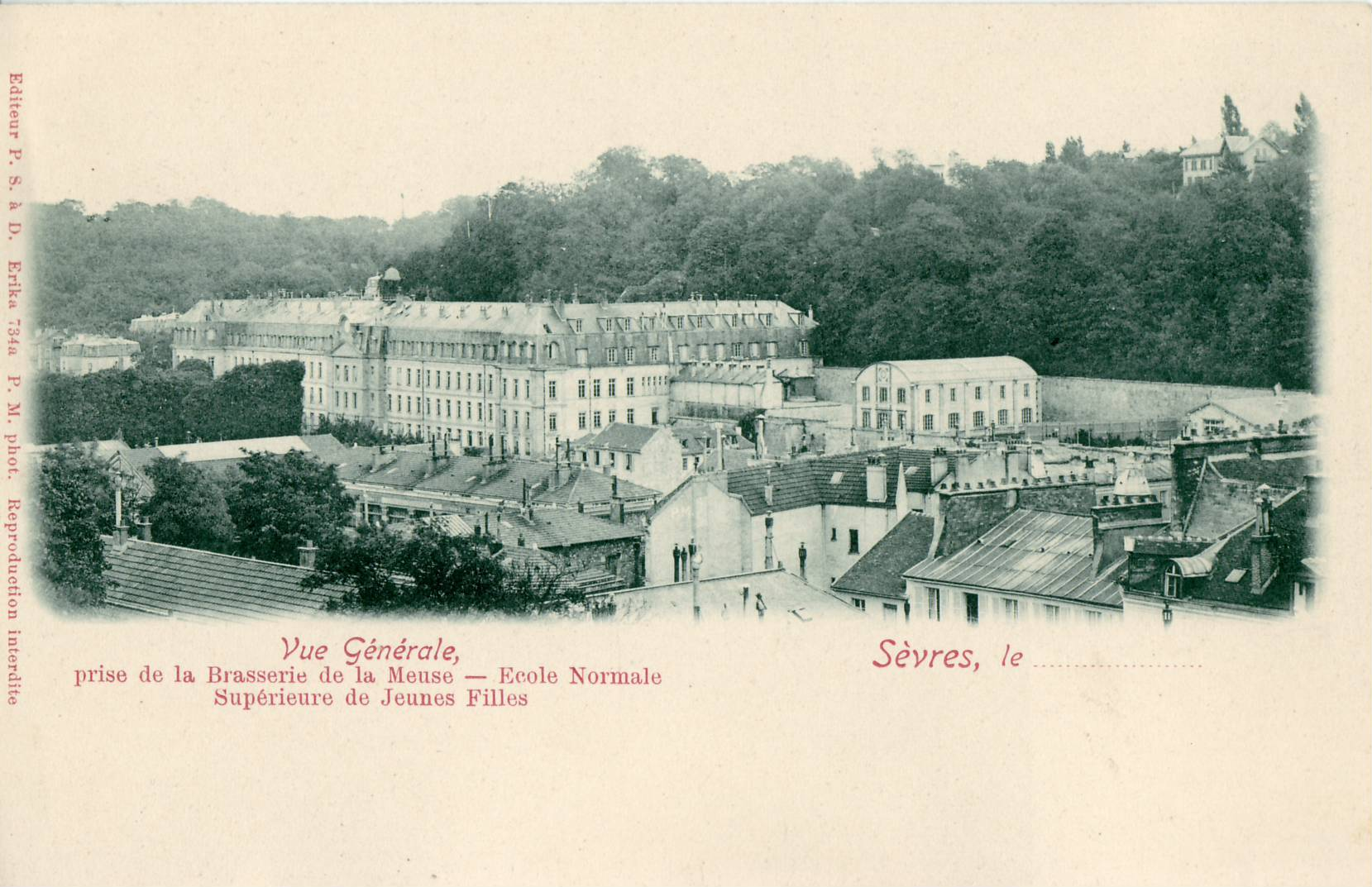
The former École normale supérieure de Sèvres, at the start of the 20th century

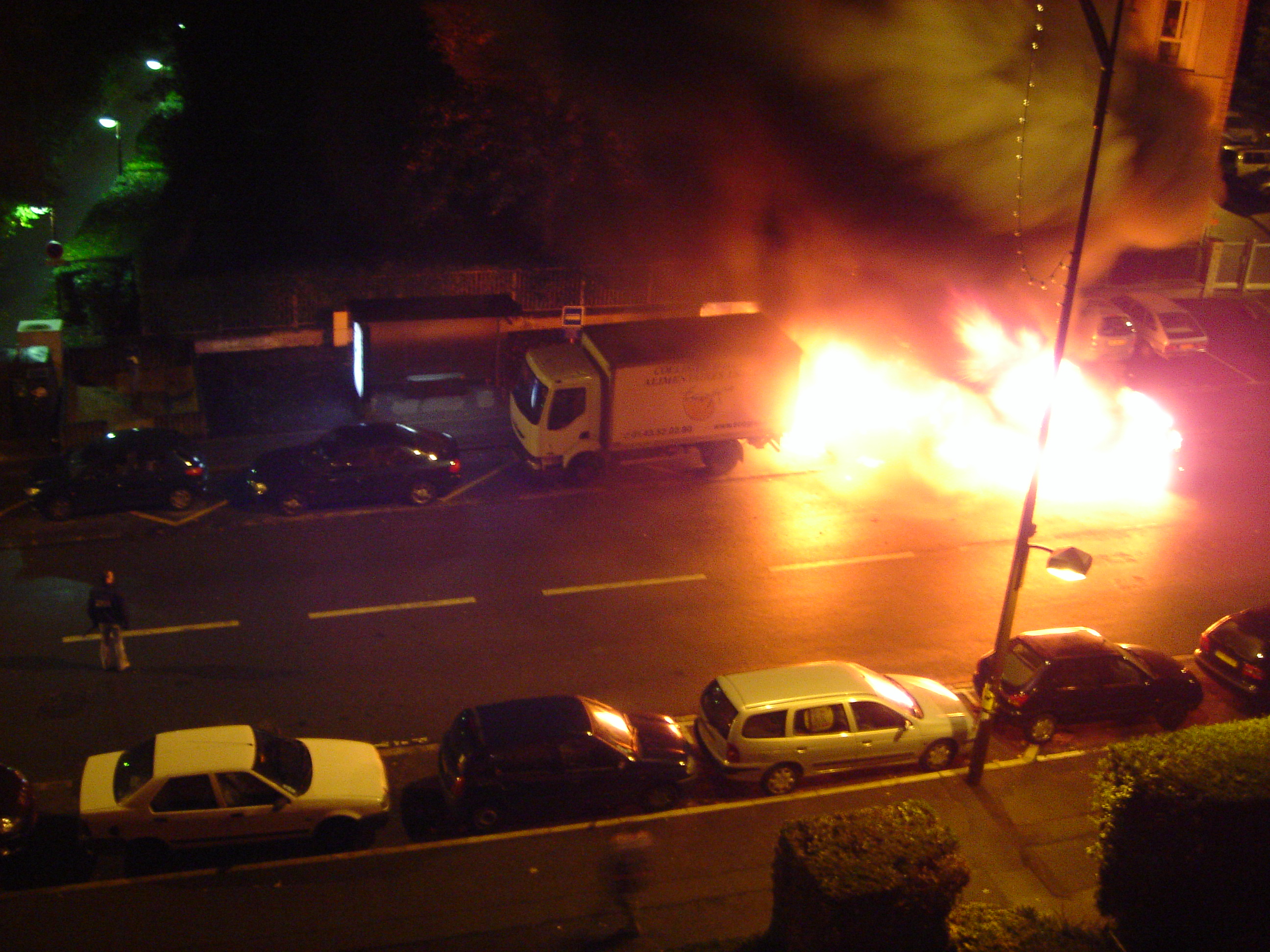
A car on fire in the Grande Rue on the night of 2–3 November 2005 during the 2005 French riots

- The town of Sèvres existed in 560, when Saint Germain, Bishop of Paris, healed a sick person and built the church.
- The Church of Saint-Romain-de-Blaye, current and several times revised, dates from the 13th century. There was a seigniorial château.
- The Hôtel de Ville dates from about 1630.
- The manufacture de Sèvres was formed in 1750, by the Ferme générale; they were held by the Marquis de Fulvi who operated at Vincennes.
- In 1756, Madame de Pompadour transferred the Vincennes porcelain factory to Sèvres. It was moved to the location of the Guyarde, the former resort of Lully.
- In 1760, Louis XV bought the factory which thus becomes 'royal'.
- The Pont de Sèvres, which was of wood, was begun in stone in 1809 and finished in 1820.
- In 1815, the inhabitants of Sèvres, along with some soldiers, tried to resist the Prussians who occupied and looted Sèvres, despite the capitulation signed at Saint-Cloud.
- During the repression of January and February 1894, the police conducted raids targeting the anarchists living there, without much success.
- The Treaty of Sèvres (10 August 1920)

A treaty was signed in the large room which currently houses the Museum of Porcelain at Sèvres, it was a peace treaty between the Allies and the Ottoman Empire, to the detriment of the latter.

- The Protocols of Sèvres (21 to 24 October 1956)

Protocols of Sèvres (sometimes referred to as 'agreements') are a secret seven-point agreement recording in writing a tripartite agreement between Israel, France and Great Britain in response to the nationalisation of the Suez Canal by the Egyptian leader Nasser.

- In 1961, the renovation of old town centre, which was unhealthy, accompanied by the deviation of the RN 10, was committed to by the municipality of Dr. Odic, and included the demolition of 1,500 houses and the construction of 1,600 new houses, along with 42,000 square metres (450,000 sq ft) of offices or commercial premises. The municipality of Jean Caillonneau redirected urbanisation at the end of the 1980s to promote the establishment of offices in order to "remake Sèvres as a dynamic and industrious city".

== Politics and administration ==
=== Political trends and results ===
Since the elections of 2007, Sèvres belongs to the communes of more than 3,500 inhabitants, using voting machines.

In the referendum on the Constitutional Treaty for Europe on 29 May 2005, Sévriens mostly voted for the European Constitution, with 69.93% in favour against 30.07% not in favour, with a 24.08% abstention rate (entire France: No at 54.67%, Yes at 45.33%).

At the 2007 presidential election, the first round saw Nicolas Sarkozy in the lead with 35.58% or 4,750 votes, followed by Ségolène Royal with 26,09% or 3,212 votes, and then François Bayrou with 23.35% or 2,875 votes, no other candidates exceeded the threshold of 5%. In the second round, 56.40% or 6,661 voted for Nicolas Sarkozy with 43.60% or 5,149 voting for Ségolène Royal, a result which was more disposed than the national average. In the second round, 53.06% voted for Nicolas Sarkozy and 46.94% for Ségolène Royal. For this presidential election, the turnout rate was very high. There were 18,455 registered voters in Sèvres, 89.56% or 16,528 voters participated in the ballot, the abstention rate was 10.44% or 1,927 votes, with 0.54% or 90 votes conducted as a blank vote, and finally 99.46% or 16,438 votes were cast.

In the 2014 municipal election, a miscellaneous right (DVD) list led by Grégoire de La Roncière opposed the list led by the outgoing mayor, François Kosciusko-Morizet, of the Union for a Popular Movement (UMP), and then by Laurence Roux-Fouillet after the withdrawal of the latter. In the second round, on 30 March, the DVD list gained two more votes than the UMP list (3,279 votes against 3,277). On 4 April, Grégoire de La Roncière was elected Mayor of Sèvres by the new municipal council.

=== Municipal government ===
Sèvres has implemented a Communal Youth Council, so as to involve young people in the life of the commune.

=== List of mayors ===
Since 1971, five mayors have held office in Sèvres:

List of mayors of Sèvres since 1971
Start	End	Name	Party	Other details
21 March 1971	1978	Georges Lenormand	PCF	General Counsel (1967–1970 and 1976–1982); Resigned
1978	13 March 1983	Roger Fajnzylberg	PCF	
13 March 1983	18 June 1995	Jean Caillonneau	UDF–CDS	Insurance executive
18 June 1995	4 April 2014	François Kosciusko-Morizet	UMP	Politician
4 April 2014	In office	Grégoire de La Roncière	DVD	Vice-president of the communauté d'agglomération G.P.S.O.

=== Judicial and administrative authorities ===
Sèvres is within the jurisdiction of the Tribunal d'instance as well as in that of the police court in Boulogne-Billancourt.

=== Environmental policy ===
The municipality wishes to enhance its environmental richness (forests, banks of the Seine, built heritage, topography, etc.) which is an asset in terms of image for the city and quality of life for its inhabitants: "It should preserve those elements which are the links of a string of parks and gardens which are also involved in large landscape continuity, of opportunities for walks and tours at an intercommunal level".

=== Twin towns ===
Sèvres is twinned with:

- Wolfenbüttel, Germany, since 1980
- Mount Prospect, Illinois, United States, since 2000

Furthermore, the commune of Sèvres signed a cooperation agreement with the Mărăcineni commune in Romania, in 1991.

=== Intercommunality ===
The commune of Sèvres was a member of the Agglomeration Community of Val de Seine and is a member of the Communauté d'agglomération Grand Paris Seine Ouest since its inception on 27 November 2008, along with the communes of Boulogne-Billancourt, Chaville, Issy-les-Moulineaux, Meudon, Vanves and Ville-d'Avray.

== Population and society ==
=== Demography ===
==== Demographic evolution ====
Historical population

Year	Pop.	±% p.a.
1793	2,700	—
1800	2,642	−0.31%
1806	2,779	+0.85%
1821	3,131	+0.80%
1831	3,973	+2.41%
1836	3,977	+0.02%
1841	4,626	+3.07%
1846	4,963	+1.42%
1851	4,750	−0.87%
1856	5,760	+3.93%
1861	6,328	+1.90%
1866	6,754	+1.31%
1872	7,096	+0.83%

Year	Pop.	±% p.a.
1876	6,552	−1.97%
1881	6,834	+0.85%
1886	7,620	+2.20%
1891	6,902	−1.96%
1896	7,317	+1.17%
1901	8,216	+2.34%
1906	8,143	−0.18%
1911	9,465	+3.05%
1921	11,436	+1.91%
1926	14,505	+4.87%
1931	15,457	+1.28%
1936	15,501	+0.06%
1946	15,242	−0.17%

Year	Pop.	±% p.a.
1954	17,109	+1.45%
1962	20,129	+2.05%
1968	20,083	−0.04%
1975	21,149	+0.74%
1982	20,208	−0.65%
1990	21,990	+1.06%
1999	22,534	+0.27%
2007	23,174	+0.35%
2012	23,572	+0.34%
2017	23,507	−0.06%
2023	22,303	−0.87%

From 1962 to 1999: Population without double counting; for the years following: municipal population.
Source: Ldh/EHESS/Cassini until 1999 and INSEE (1968–2023)

==== Age structure ====
The distribution of age groups of the commune of Sèvres and of the department of Hauts-de-Seine are shown below. The population of Sèvres is older than the average of Hauts-de-Seine.

Population by age of Sèvres, 2023 (%)

80+	6.4
65–79	12.1
55–64	12.9
40–54	22.1
25–39	17.6
15–24	11.9
0–14	16.8

Total: 99.8

male

female

Source: INSEE

Population by age of Hauts-de-Seine, 2023 (%)

90+	4.8
75–89	10.8
60–74	11.1
45–59	20.5
30–44	22.5
15–29	12.4
0–14	17.9

Total: 100

male

female

Source: INSEE

=== Education ===
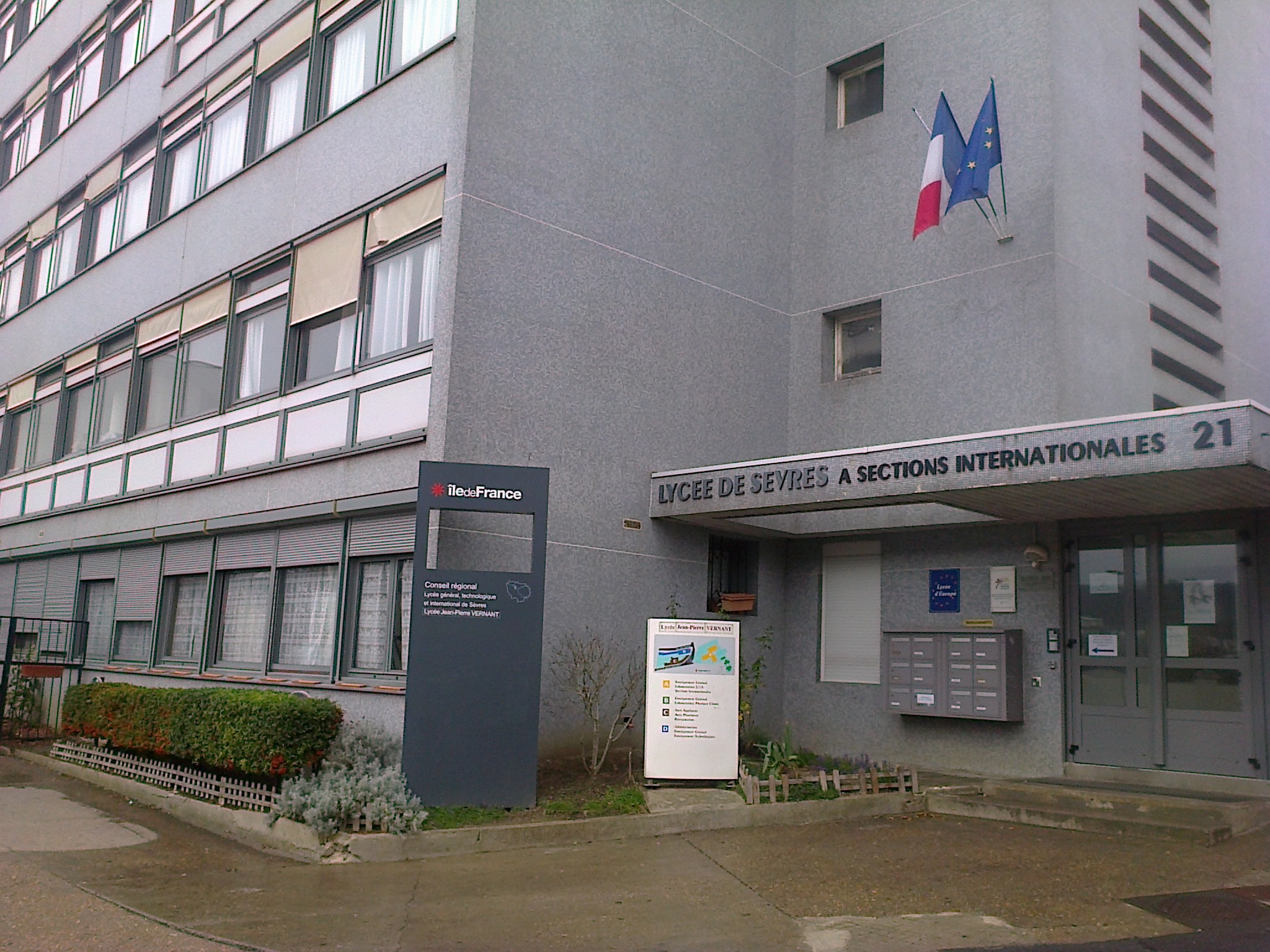
Lycée Jean-Pierre-Vernant

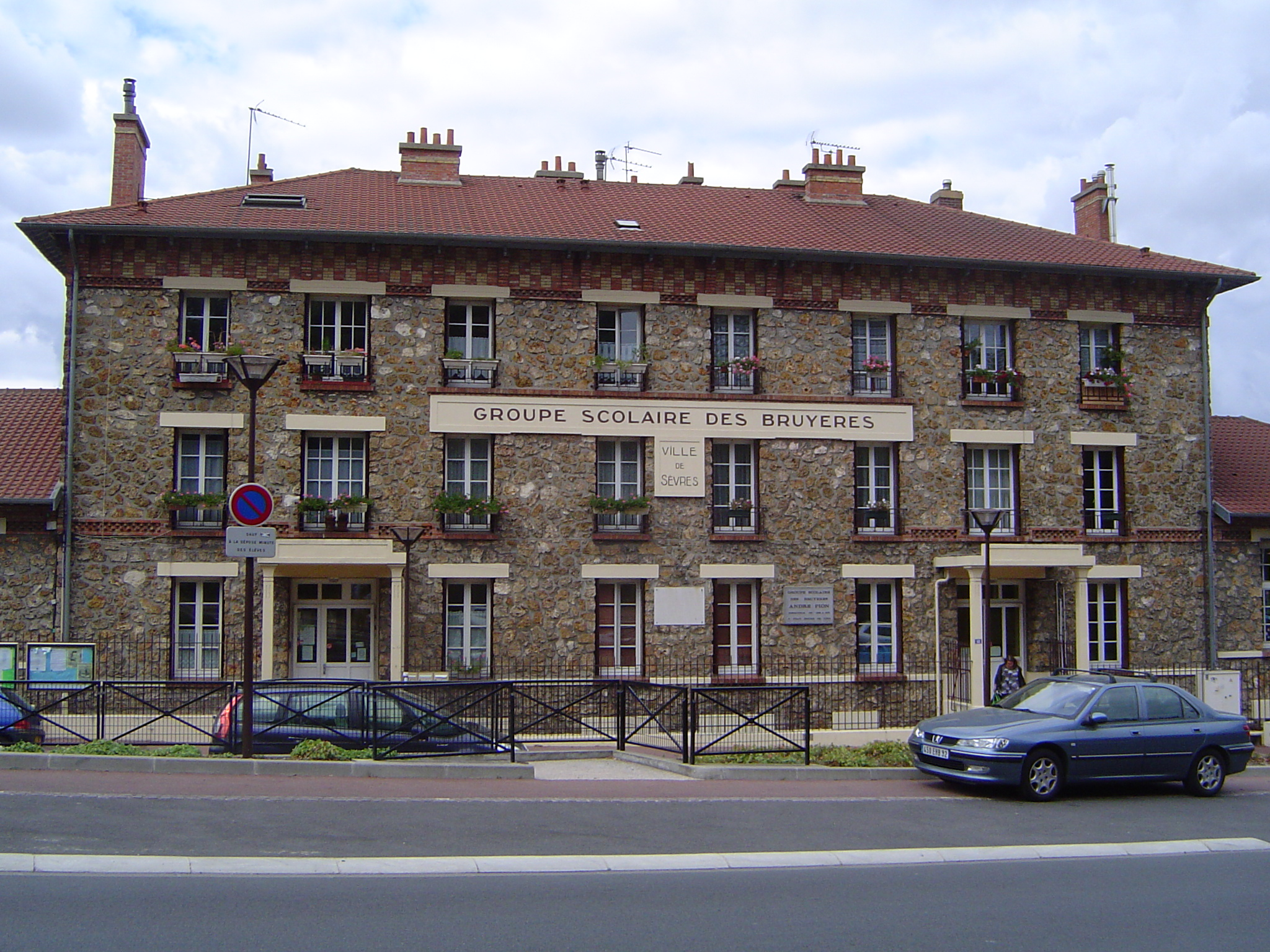
Le groupe scolaire des Bruyères

The city administers six nursery schools and five primary schools.

The department manages a middle school (collège) and the region of Île-de-France a senior high school/sixth-form college (lycée) by the name of Lycée Jean Pierre Vernant in memory of the Compagnon de la Libération and historian. The college/high school welcomes the international sections of Sèvres (bilingual French/English and French/German) recognised for their excellence. These international sections prepare undergraduate French and OIB (Baccalauréat International Option).

Sèvres also boasts a private institution (school and college): The Jeanne-d'Arc [Joan of Arc] School.

The École supérieure de fonderie et de forge, a private engineering college is also installed on the territory of the commune, in the middle of the technical centre of the foundry industries

Strate School of Design a private institution for technical education teaching industrial design, 3D modeling and design thinking is also located in Sèvres.

==== History of education ====
The Maison d'enfants de Sèvres operated from September 1941, under the direction of Yvonne Hagnauer (Goéland), until November 1958 at 14 Rue Croix-Bosset. It then moved to the Château de Bussières, on the opposite bank of the Seine. In 1991 it became the College Jean-Marie-Guyot.

The École normale supérieure of young girls was created in Sèvres in 1881. It then moved to Boulevard Jourdan, Paris, before merging with the École Normale Supérieure, in 1985. It held the old buildings of the porcelain factory, which today houses the International Centre for pedagogical studies.

=== Cultural events and festivities ===
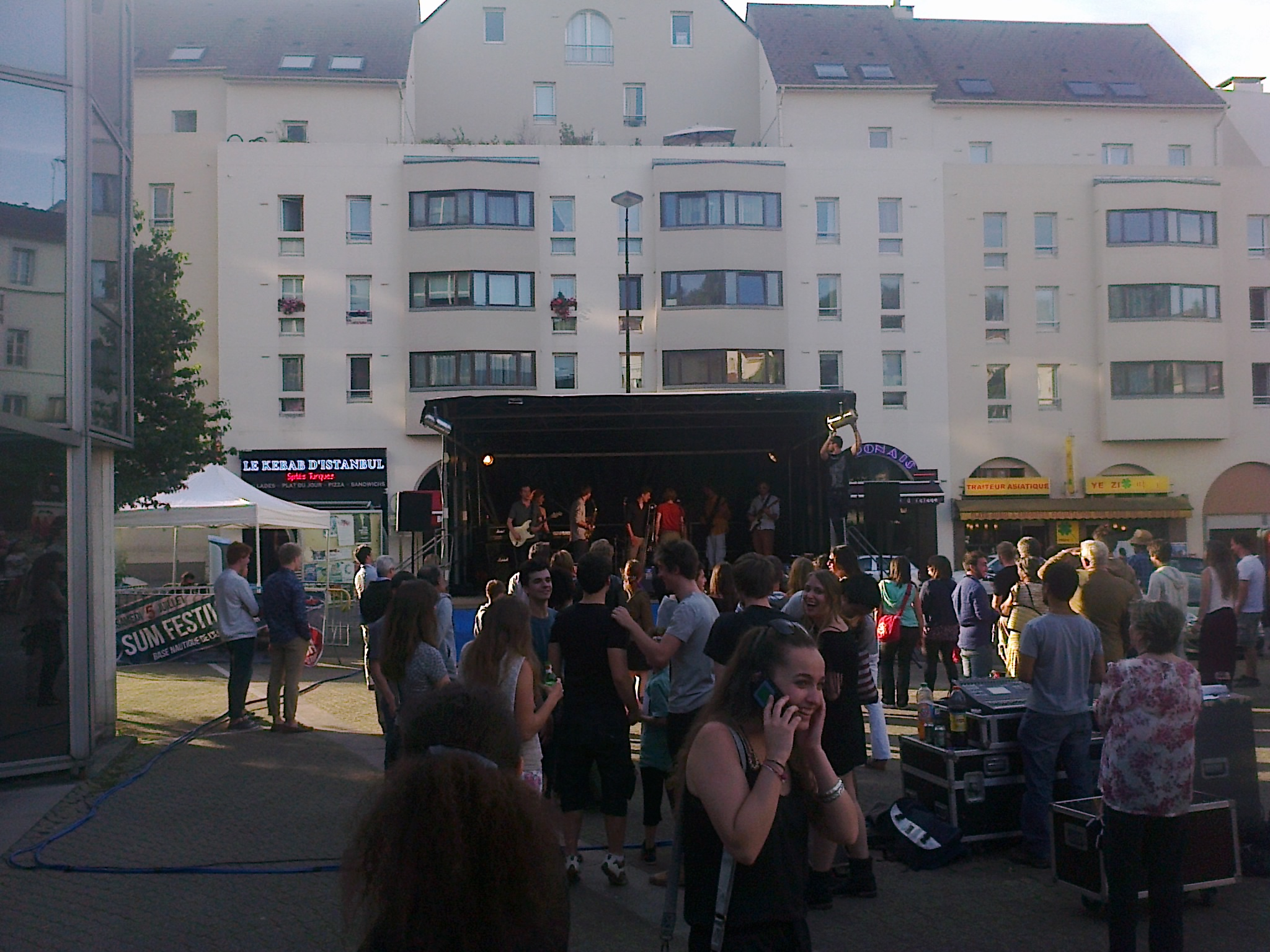
Concert for the 2014 Festival of Music in Place Gabriel Péri in Sèvres

On the last Saturday of September is "The Dictation of Sèvres" writing competition. This has been held since 2007.

=== Health ===
Sèvres is home to one of the sites of the Centre Hospitalier de 4 Villes [Central Hospital of 4 cities]. Since 1 January 2006, this centre brings together the Centre Hospitalier Intercommunal Jean Rostand, (which already included Chaville, Sèvres and Ville d'Avray) and the Centre Hospitalier de Saint-Cloud. The site of Sèvres specialises in hospitalisation and consultation in maternity/gynaecology/fertility and medical services.

=== Sport ===
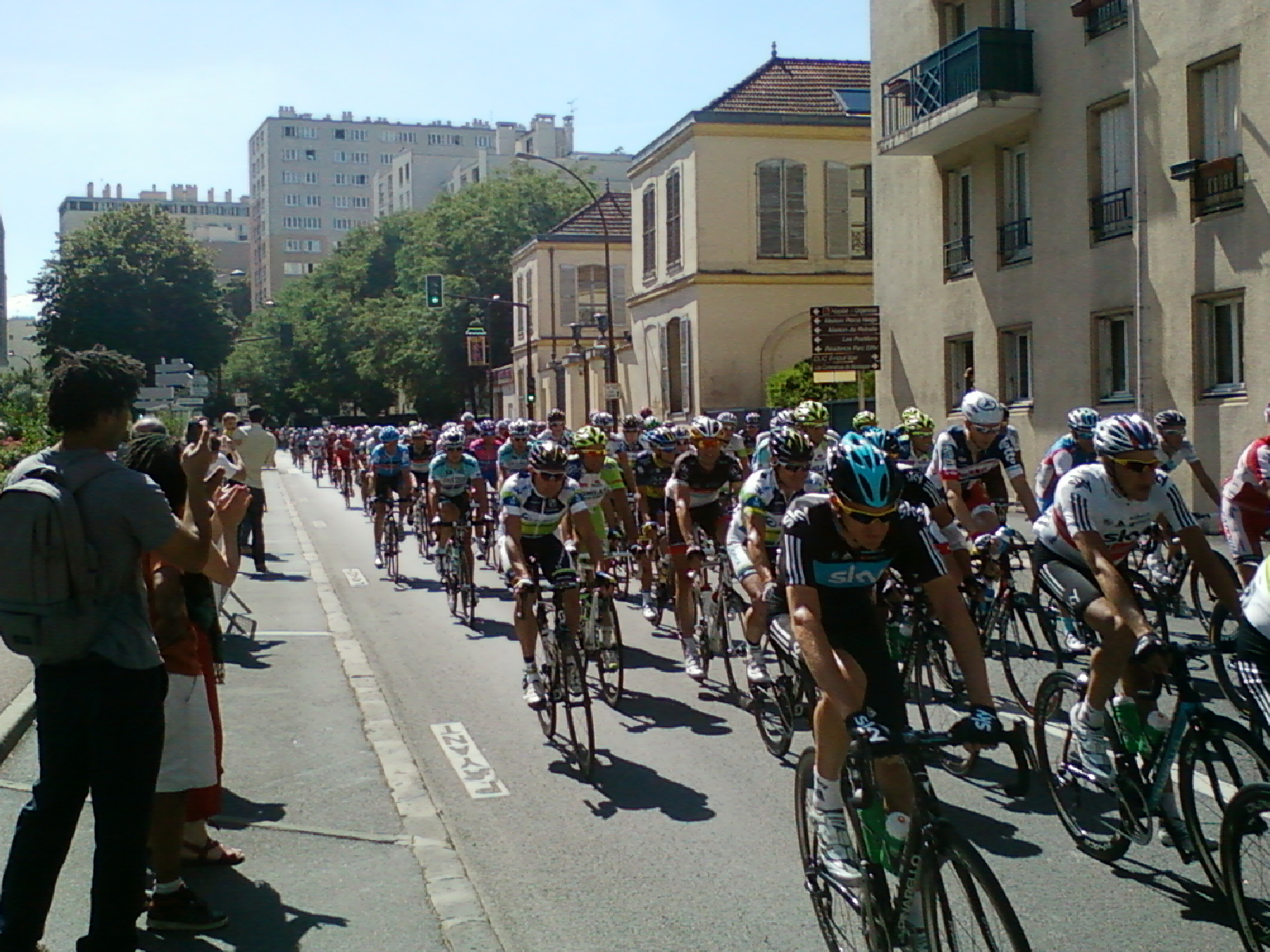
Passage of the Tour de France along the Grande Rue during Stage 20 of the 2012 Tour de France, on 22 July

The Sèvres Football Club senior team is currently coached by Alexandre Matejic, a former professional footballer, and winner of the 2004–2005 Coupe Gambardella with Toulouse FC. Operating in the departmental divisions, Sèvres FC just missed reaching the 4th round of the Coupe de France 2008–2009. Indeed, playing against Red Star (then in CFA) at the Fountains Stadium, Sèvres FC opened the score in the 7th minute through Thomas Millet. The score remained at 1-0 for seventy-five minutes, until the equalisation by Demba Diagouraga, for the team from Saint-Ouen. The Sèvres team, however, collapsed in overtime and lost four goals, giving the 'Greens' a 5–1 win after extra time.

Having been a location which the 2012 Tour de France passed through on that year's final stage, Sèvres will host the departure for Stage 21, the final stage of the 2015 Tour de France, on 26 July, heading towards the year's ultimate finish line on the Champs-Élysées.

=== Media ===
Sèvres has been host to the internet radio station GOOM Radio, since 2007.

=== Worship ===
Sèvres has places of Catholic, Jewish, Muslim, Protestant and Buddhist worship.

==== Catholic worship ====
Since January 2010, the commune of Sèvres is part of the deanery of the hills, one of the nine deaneries of the Diocese of Nanterre.

Within this deanery, places of Catholic worship under the two parishes of Sèvres are:

- Parish of Saint-Romain: Church of Saint-Romain
- Parish of Notre-Dame-des-Bruyères: Notre-Dame des Bruyères.

==== Protestant worship ====
Reformed Church of France (Sequoia Parish Centre)

==== Jewish worship ====
Jewish Community of Sèvres

==== Muslim worship ====
Association of Muslims of Sèvres

==== Buddhist faith ====
It is at Sèvres where the Tinh Tam pagoda is situated.

== Economy ==
=== Income of the population and taxation ===
In 2010, the median taxable household income was €44,450, which ranked Sèvres at 960th position among the 31,525 communes with more than 39 households in metropolitan France.

=== Employment ===
In 2007, the communal employment rate was close to 100% (10,369 jobs for 10,607 employable people who resided in Sèvres), which corresponds to the objective which was set out in the blueprint of the Val de Seine, to the horizon of 2015.

== Local culture and heritage ==
=== Places and monuments ===
The commune includes many listed monuments in the general inventory of French cultural heritage.

Monuments and sites, inventory on 31 December 2005
Title	Classified ensemble	Registered ensemble
International pedagogical centre		•
Title	Classified monument	Registered monument
National porcelain manufactory, 4 Grand-Rue: The six ovens	•	
Sèvres Espace Loisirs, 47 Grand-Rue: Former covered market	•	
House of Jardies and Memorial of Gambetta (museum)	•	
National school of ceramics		•
Building and gate, 17 Grande-Rue		•
Building, 16 Rue Troyon		•
Façades, roofs, gate, 14 rue Ville-d'Avray		•
Church		•
Former hôtel, 164 Grande-Rue: Main body, first span of both wings, closing on street, ground of the court, and interior decoration of the chapel, 33 rue		•
Armenian College		•
Title	Classified site	Registered site
Wood of Fausses-Reposes		•
Wood of Meudon and Viroflay		•
Banks of the Seine		•
Domain of Saint-Cloud with the Villeneuve-l'Etang Park	•	
Domain of Brimborion	•	
Île Monsieur	•	
Banks of the Seine		•
Ponds and their surroundings		•
Source : IAURIF

==== The Church of Saint-Romain-de-Blaye ====
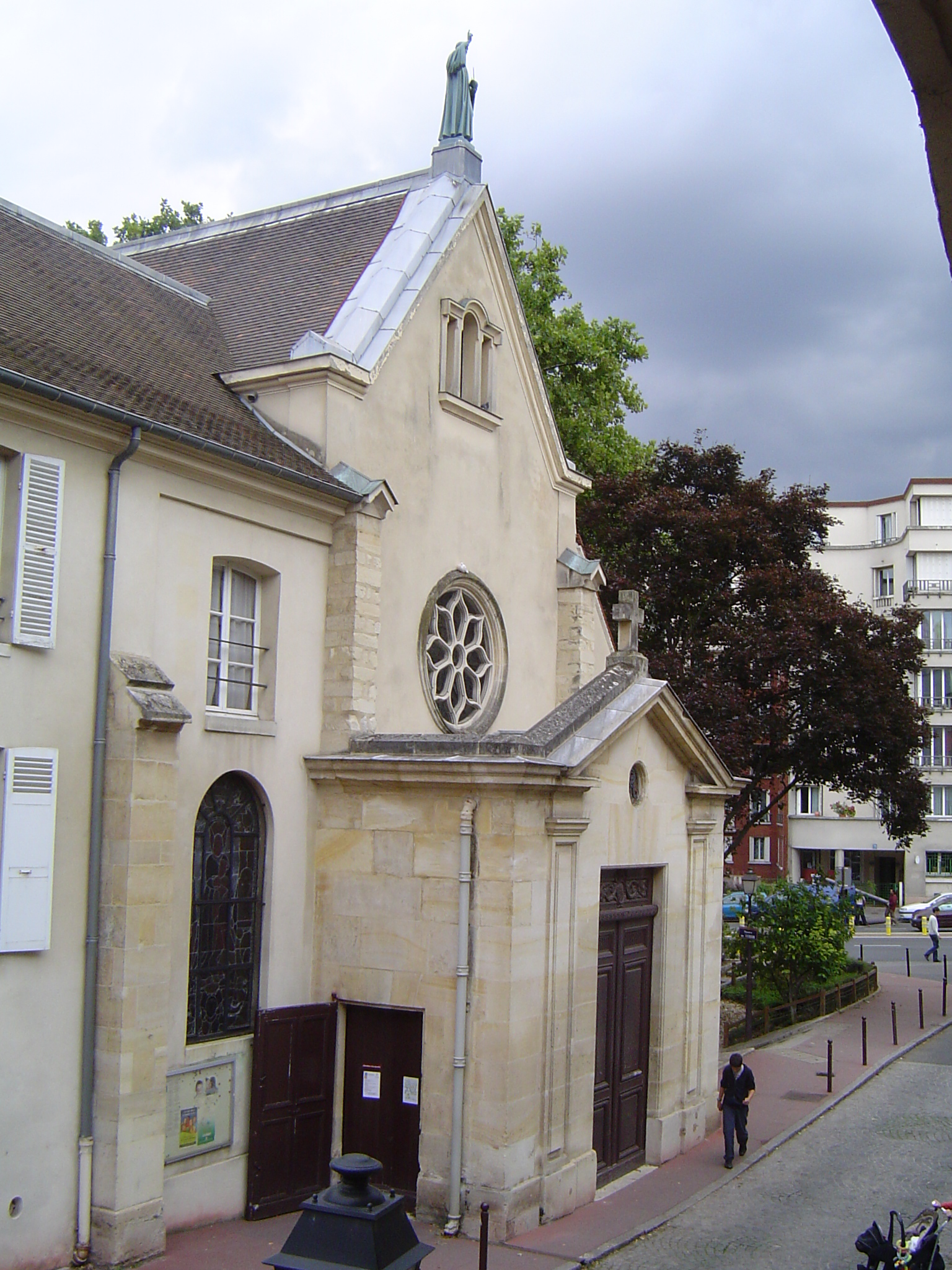
The Church of Saint-Romain (exterior)

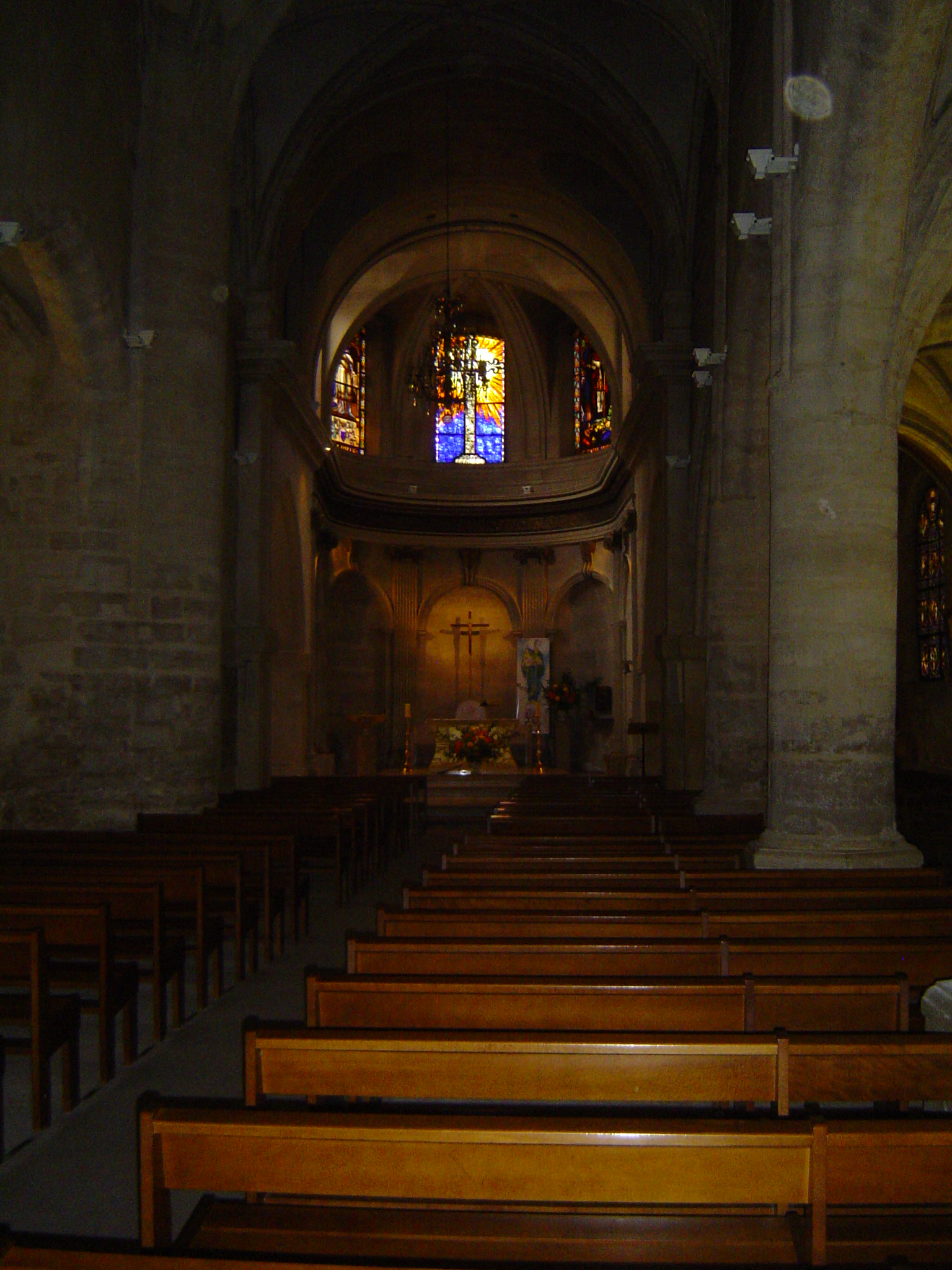
The Church of Saint-Romain (interior)

The church (Note: Saint-Romain-de-Blaye is the Basilica situated on the banks of the Gironde where Charlemagne's nephew Roland was buried in the 'Chanson de Roland'. A famous hermit named Roman lived there.) offers an amalgam of Gothic, redesigned and damaged by the 17th century: Outdoors, there is a clerestory tower which was disfigured. The rounded roof has been largely preserved, but it is much uncovered. The Way of the Cross, painted on porcelain, comes from the Manufacture de Sèvres, and stained glass windows, more than a century old. This church was inaugurated several times.

It was founded by the Merovingian King Dagobert II in the 7th century, it was a Royal Parish under Marie Leszczyńska. The first municipal assembly, created by the edict of 1787, consisted of two members: The lord, namely King Louis XVI, and the priest, as well as nine other elected members. This assembly met in the church at the end of vespers or high mass.

This church was listed in the inventory of historical monuments in 1937.

Its bell, called Anette, was blessed in 1760 and listed in the inventory of historical monuments on 27 April 1944.

The rectory was built between 1744 and 1786.

==== The Church of Our Lady of Bruyères ====
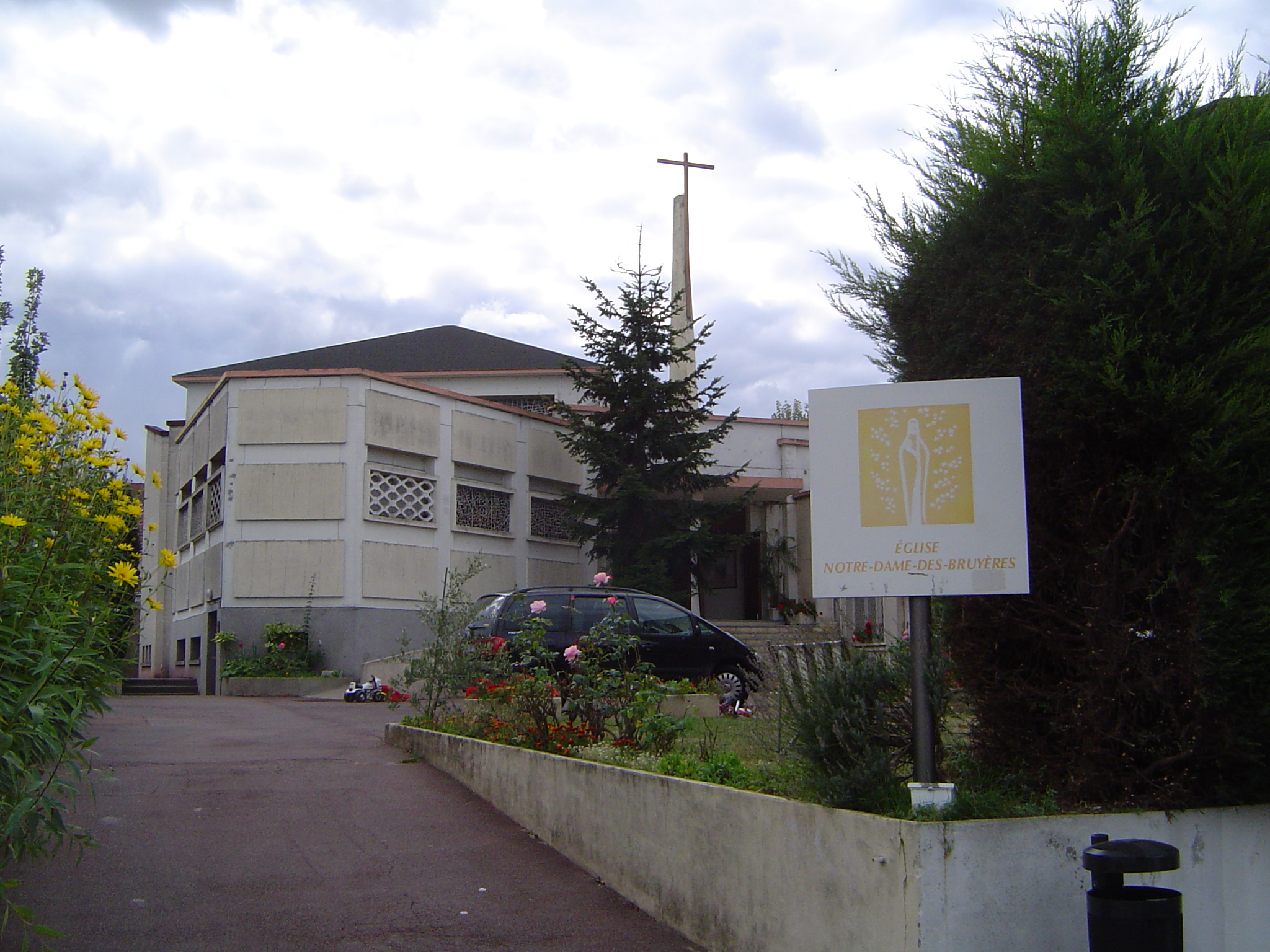
The church of Notre-Dame des Bruyères (exterior)

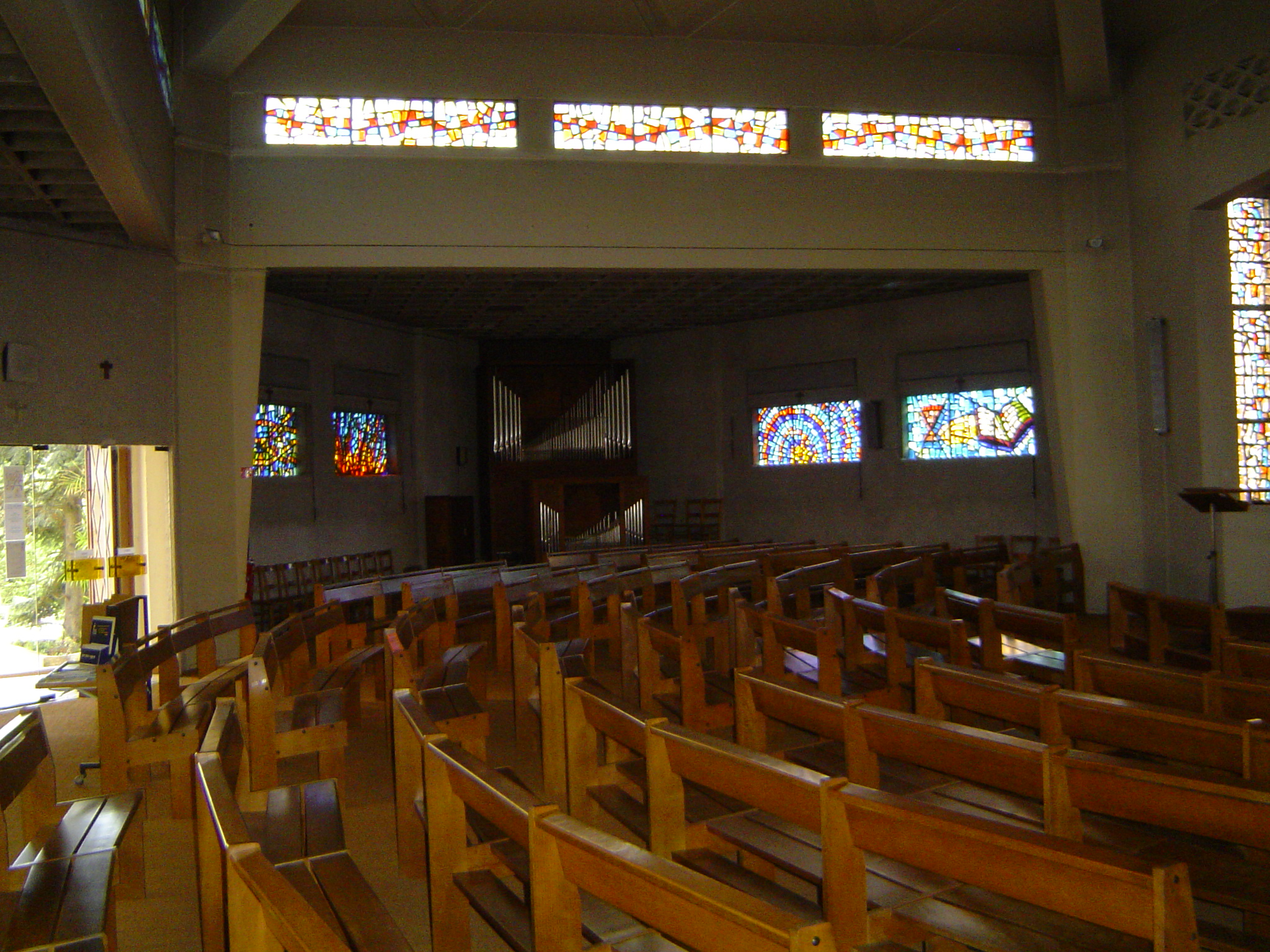
The church of Notre-Dame des Bruyères (interior)

This chapel was built in 1930, on the edge of the Route des Gardes. Established as a parish in 1962, destroyed in 1971, it was rebuilt at 23 rue du Docteur Roux in 1968.

==== The Armenian College ====
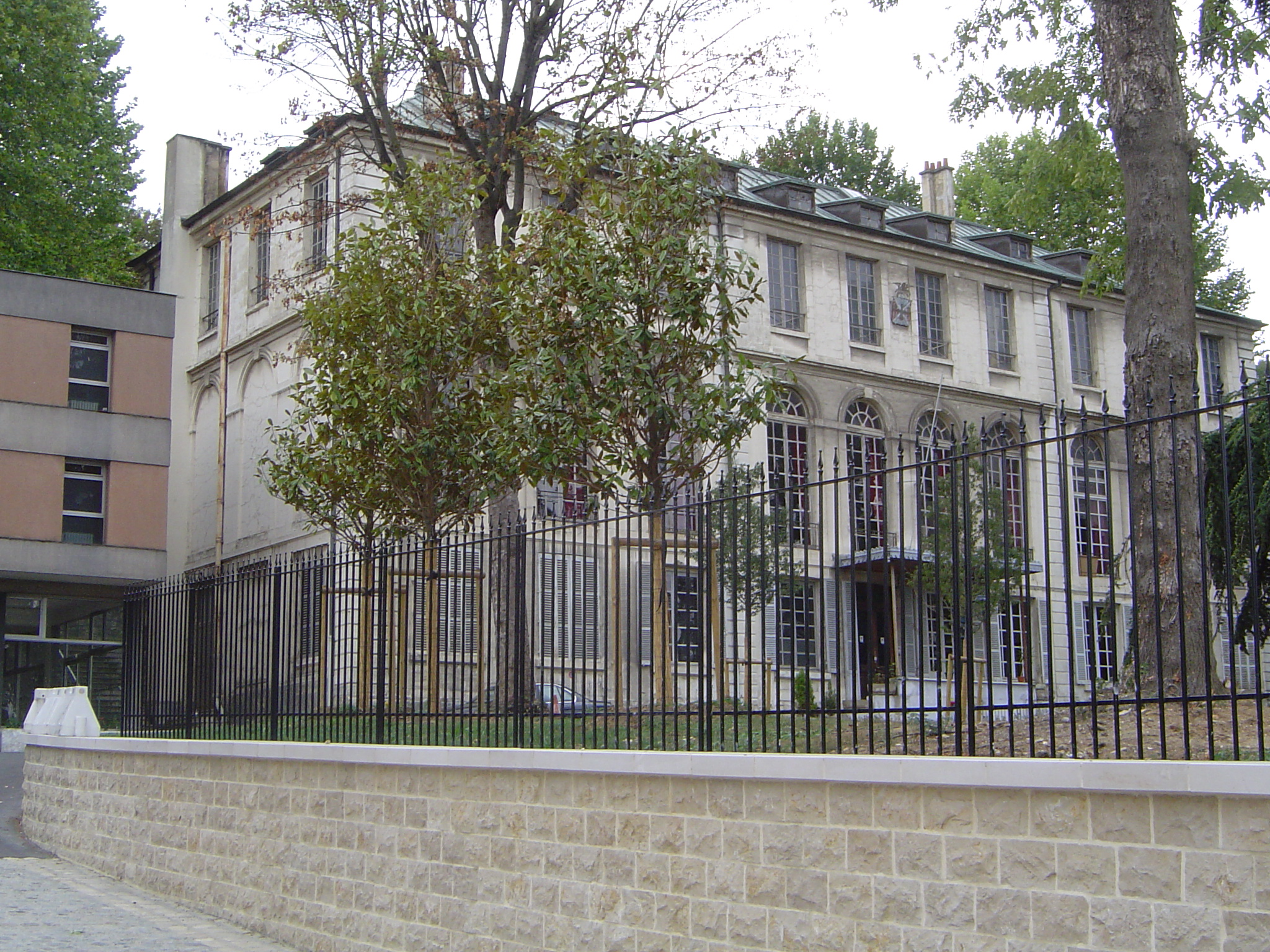
The Armenian College

This building, located 26 Rue Troyon, was given to the Pompadour for a school for girls. It was rebuilt for Bacler d'Albe between 1816 (cadastre) and 1824 (death of general). Occupied in 1898 by a convalescent home for colonial soldiers, it is currently the Samuel Moorat Armenian College, but it is currently threatened, taking into account its state.

==== The manufacture of crystals of the Queen ====
The building of this factory, located at 16 Rue Troyon and built in 1744, was classified in the inventory of historical monuments on 1 December 1986.

==== The Manufacture nationale de Sèvres ====
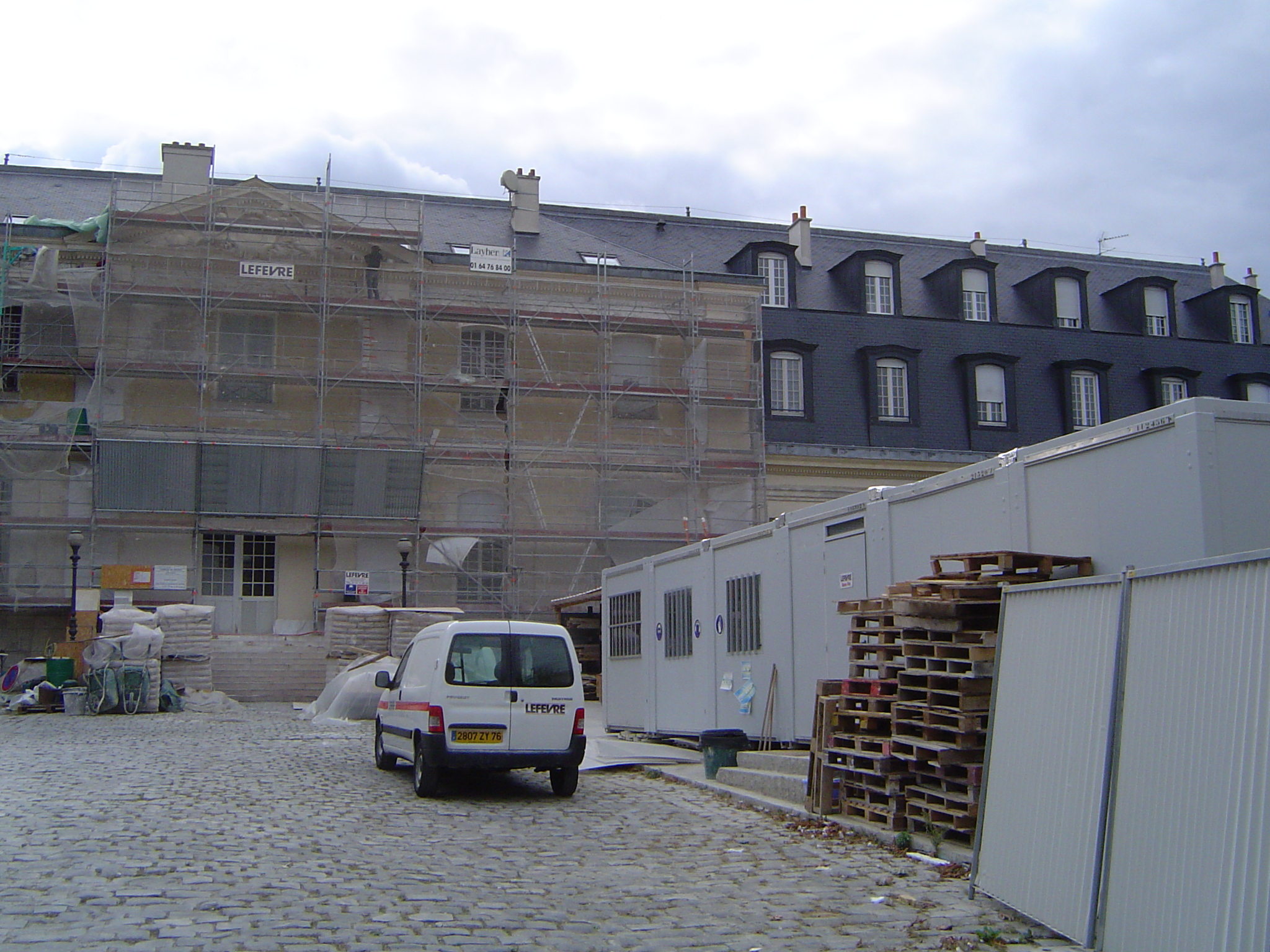
Work in process (September 2009)

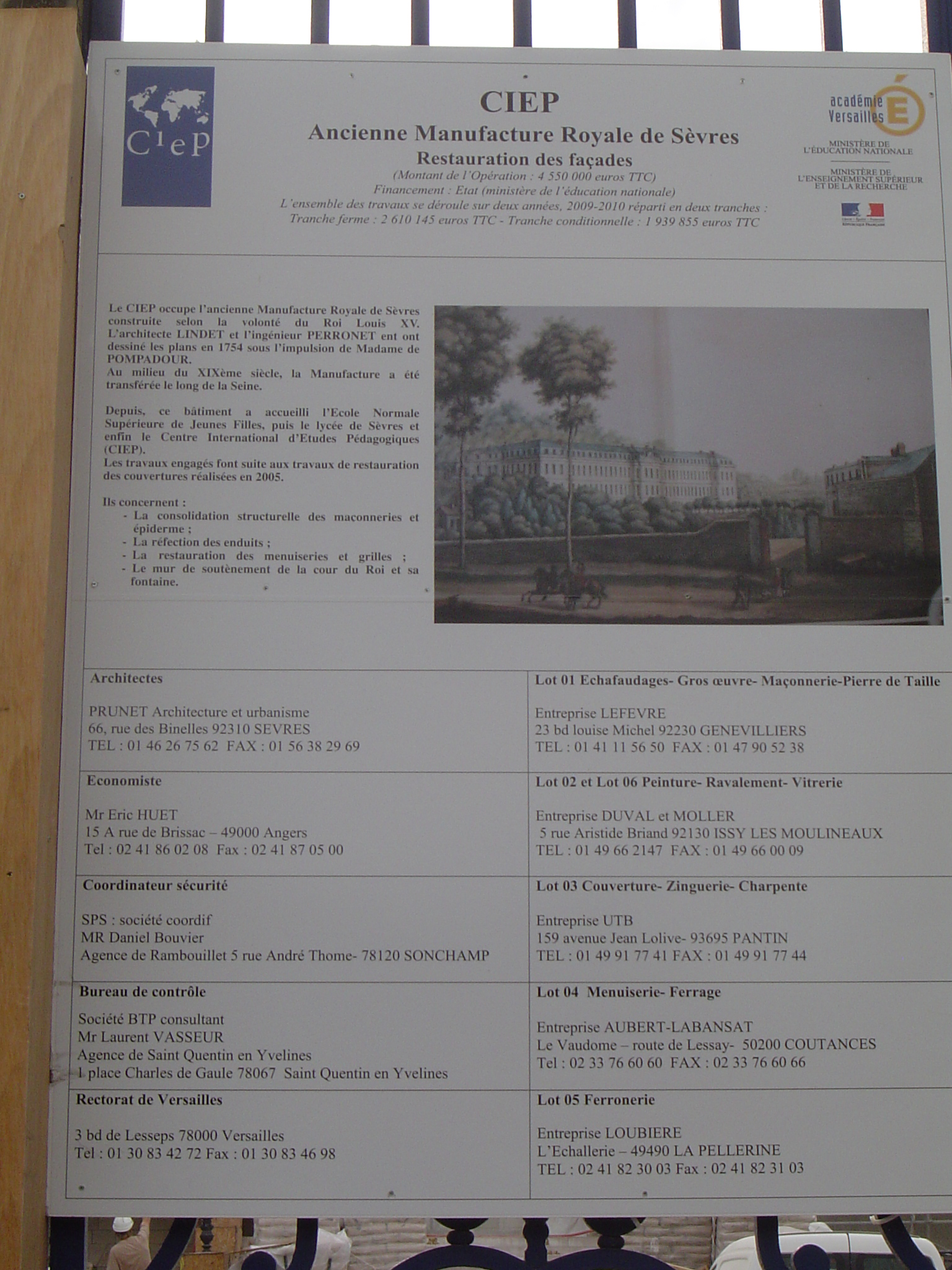
History of the building and description of work

The current building dates from 1876. This building was classified in the inventory of historical monuments on 30 October 1935. The Manufacture nationale de Sèvres is a public establishment manufacturing ceramic in the tradition of the 18th century.

==== The Maison des Jardies ====
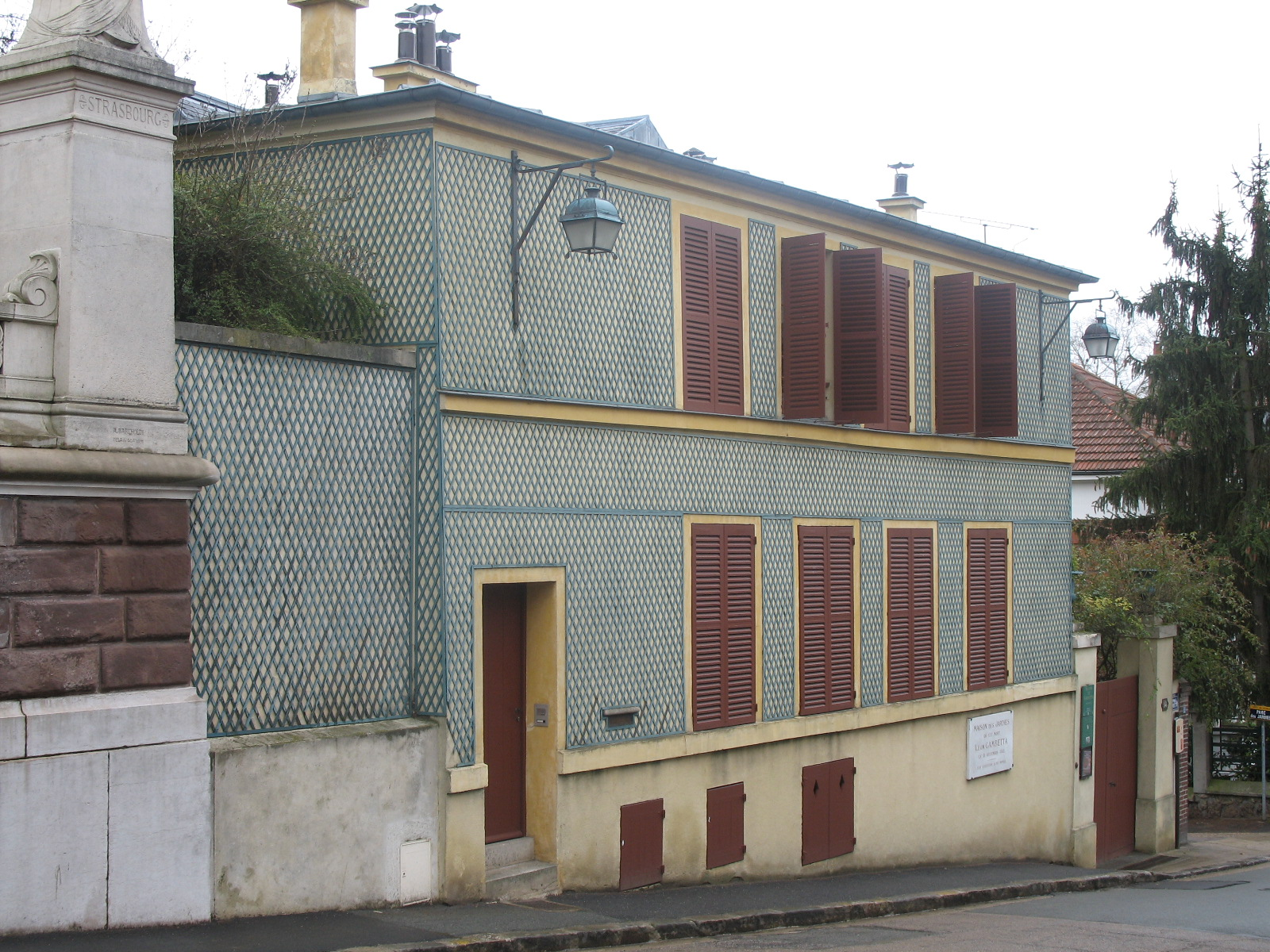
The Maison des Jardies, where Gambetta died in Sèvres

The Maison des Jardies is the home of Balzac, Corot and Gambetta who died there on 31 December 1882.

This house, located 14 Avenue Gambetta, had been bought by Balzac, which he occupied from 1837 to 1840, and was then leased by Gambetta in 1878.

==== National Ceramic Museum ====
The National Ceramic Museum was founded in 1824 by Alexandre Brongniart, director of the Manufacture nationale de Sèvres, first named Ceramic and Vitric Museum. Anxious to present the history of the techniques of ceramics and vitreous materials, through the world and eras, the latter was one of the collections of ceramics with the most variety. The Museum now brings together a varied selection of pottery, ceramics and porcelain.

==== Tinh Tam Buddhist Temple ====
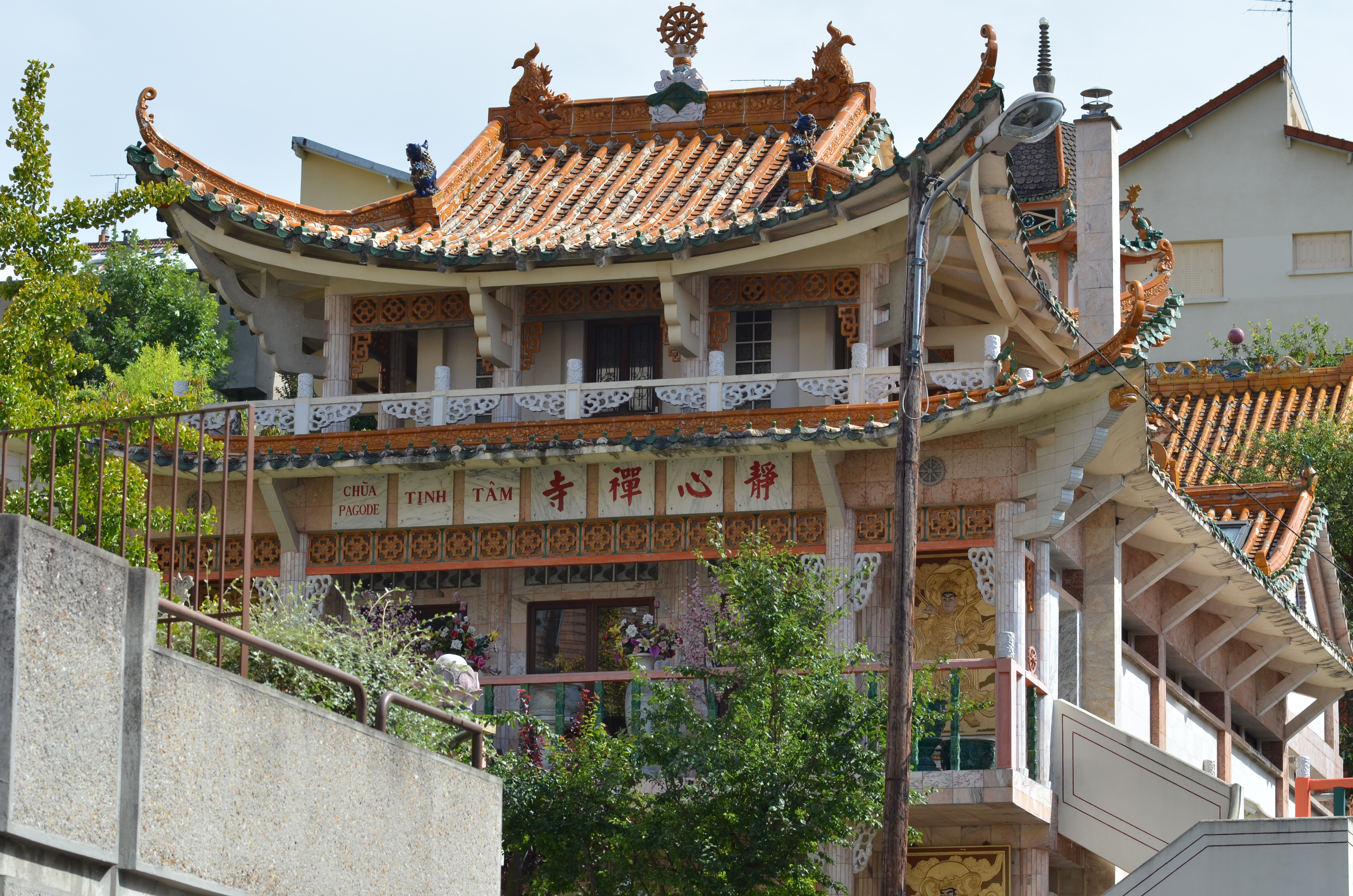
The pagoda of Sèvres

The magnificent Buddhist temple or Tinh Tam pagoda is one of the busiest in France.

==== Castel Henriette Villa ====
Castel Henriette, built in 1899–1900, was an important Art Nouveau work by the architect Hector Guimard; it was demolished in 1969.

==== Stone quarries ====
These stone quarries were dug into the hillside and used for wine storage in 1740, divided into 30 galleries including one called Royal Gallery; converted into a brasserie in 1840, which burned down in 1880 and was rebuilt in 1898.

==== Religious institutions ====
- Boarding school of the Dominicans:

The presence of nuns who teach at Sèvres dates back to 1788, when an act provided for the education of poor girls by four sisters of charity. At Sèvres, on Rue Gabriel Péri, were formerly the convent, school and boarding school of the Dominican teachers of Most Holy-Rosary of Sèvres, work encouraged by the Holy curé d'Ars, founded by the Sister Marie-Rose of the Sacred Heart Order of Preachers at the end of the 19th century, with Fr. Codant, in 1858, of which novices carried the name of servants of the Sacred Heart and had several foundations, in San Remo for example during the exile from France in 1903, and also an orphanage, Rue Troyon (they returned to France in 1913 and asked for Government permission to reopen a novitiate). During the war an ambulance and infirmary for wounded soldiers was installed in the convent.

- Novitiate of the Assumptionists:

On some old postcards, one can admire the Chapel of the Assumptionists, located at 14 Rue de la Croix-Bosset in the quarter of La Croix-Bosset. This property, acquired on 30 April 1874, was offered to the religious of the assumption at the end of the year 1877 to become the Paris novitiate outside the city. The Oblates of the Assumption also settled in Sèvres and then a community of Assumptionist sisters. Finally, the religious of the province of Paris between 1946 and 1964, a lively workers' mission centre of Saint-Étienne in Sèvres, on Avenue Division Leclerc, a community called La Cloche, close to the Renault factories.

=== Cultural heritage ===
==== Sèvres and artworks ====
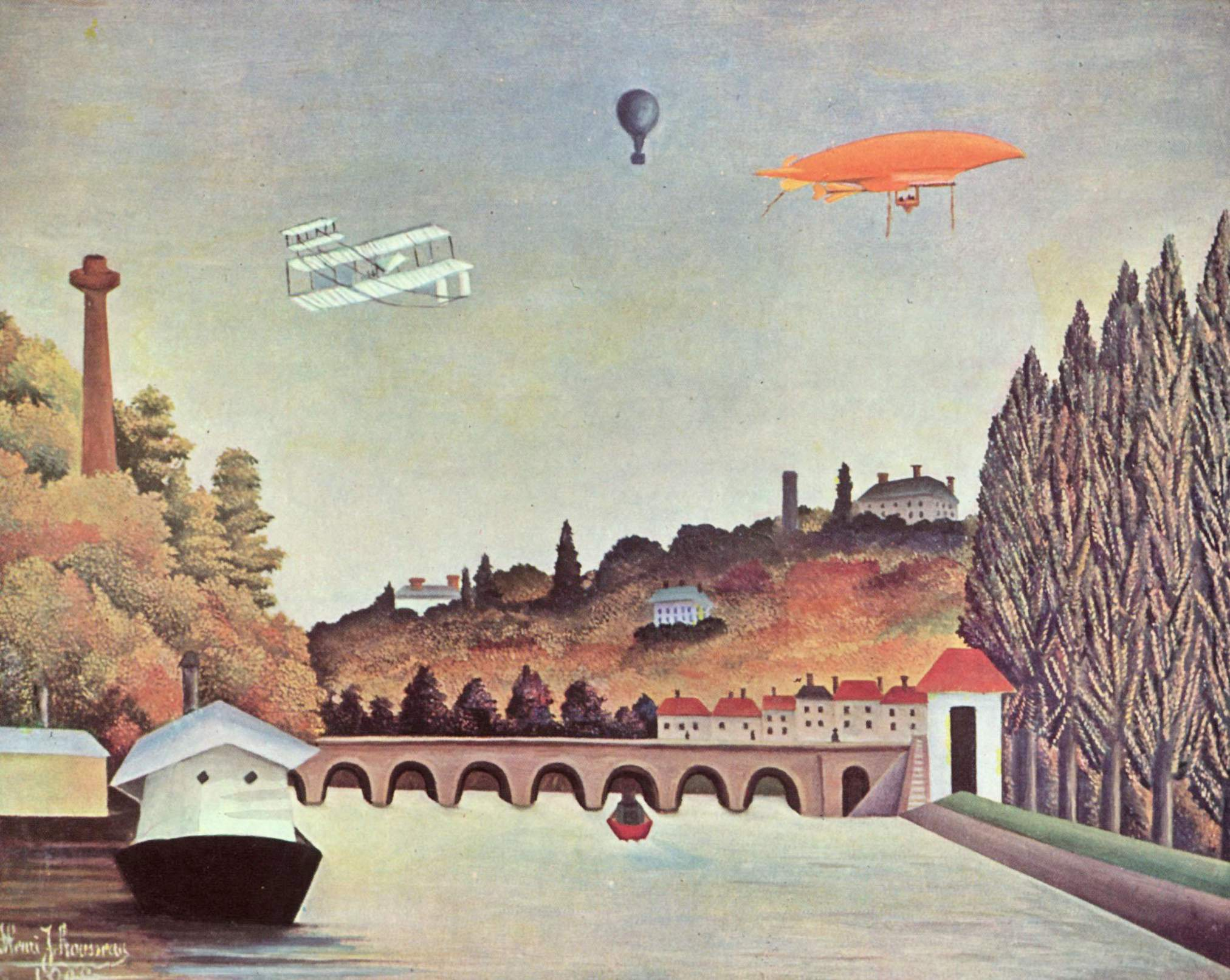
Canvas of Douanier Rousseau: Vue du pont de Sèvres, 1908

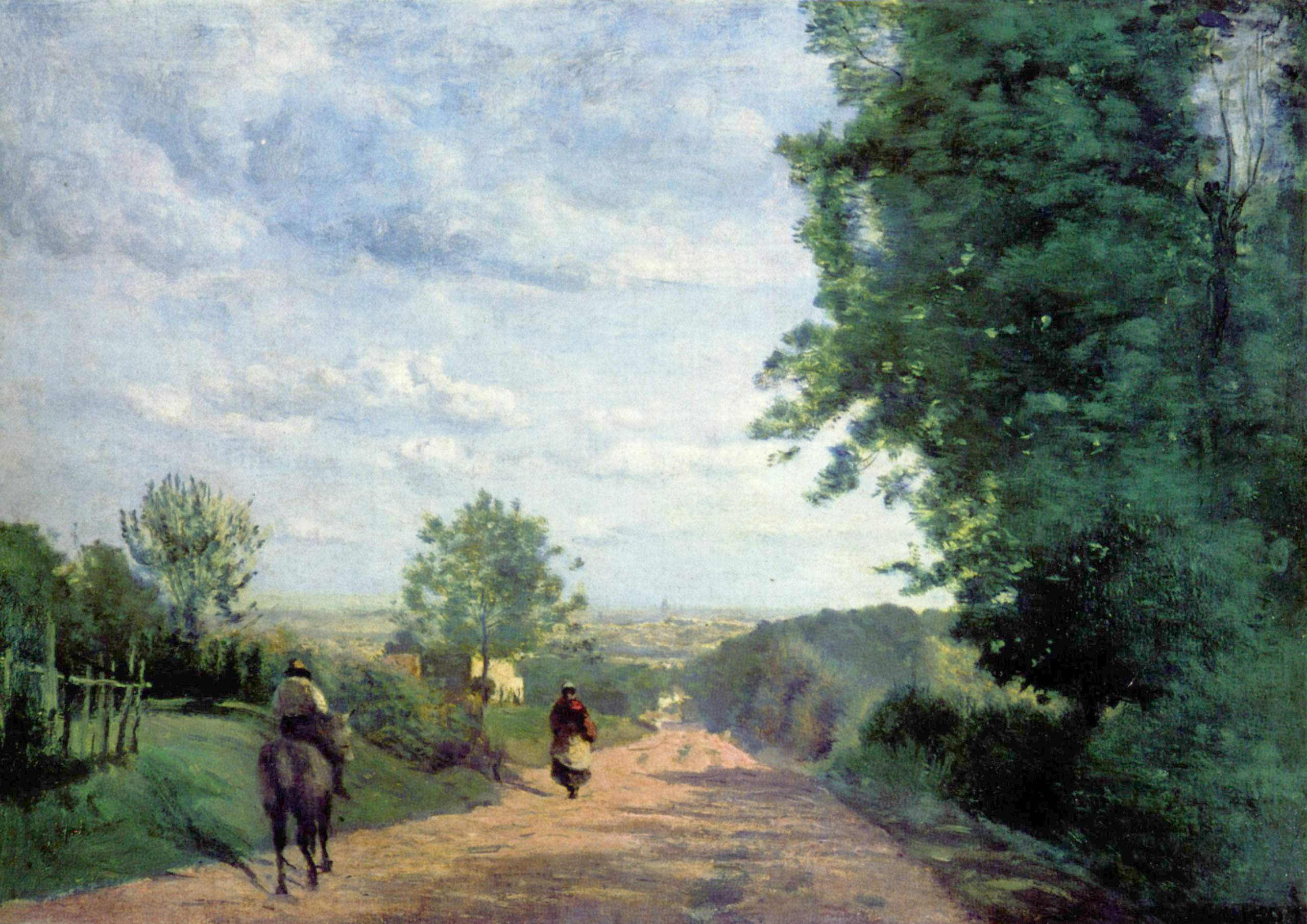
Road to Sèvres, Jean-Baptiste-Camille Corot, 1855–1865.

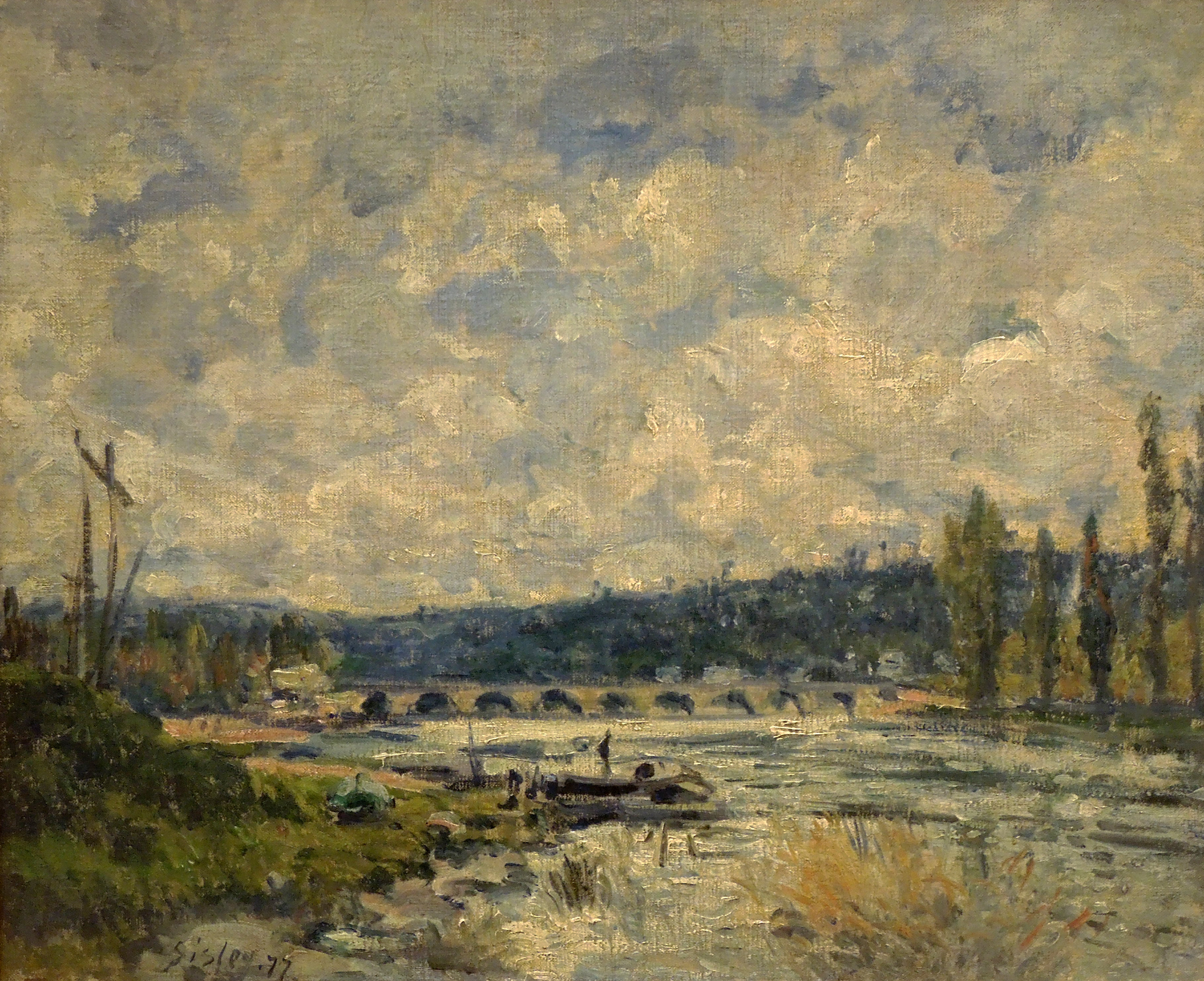
Sisley: Le Pont de Sèvres

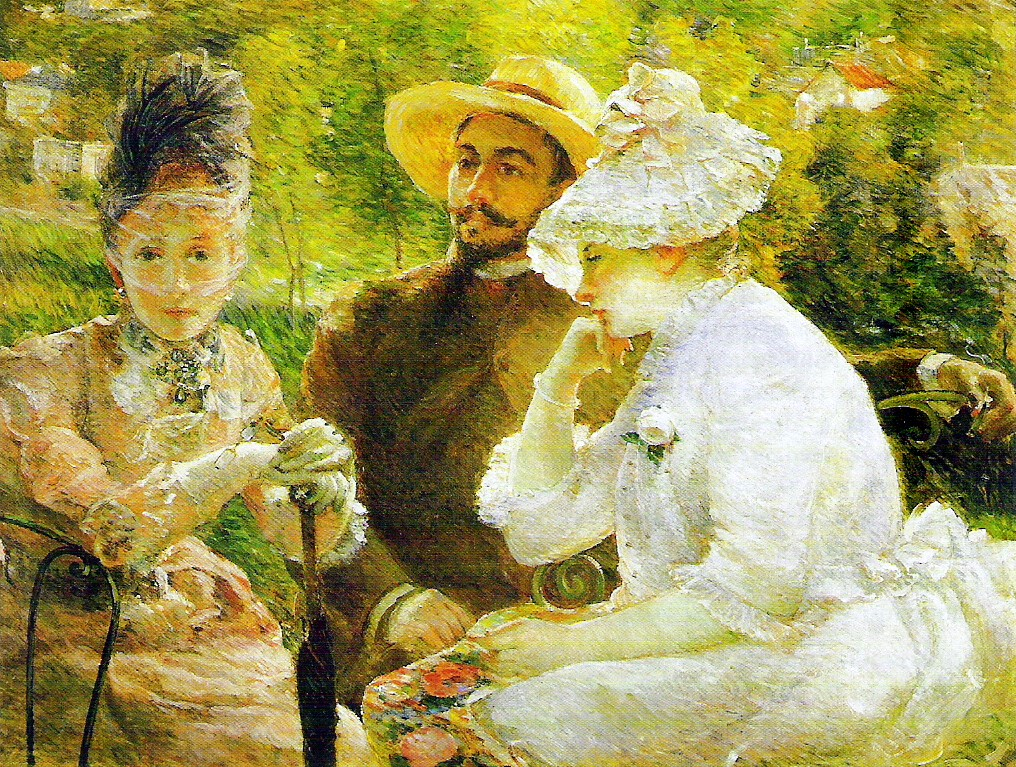
Marie Bracquemond, Sur la terrasse de Sèvres (The terrace of the villa Brancas). 1880 with Fantin-Latour, Petit Palais

Sèvres, near Paris, attracted renowned painters:

- Samuel William Reynolds painted Saint-Cloud et le pont de Sèvres (Musée Condé, Chantilly)
- The Douanier Rousseau painted in 1908 a Vue du pont de Sèvres (The Pushkin State Museum of Fine Arts, Moscow)
- Sisley, who lived in Grand-Rue, painted the former factory, the bridge and the banks of the Seine, paths
- Corot is painted his famous Chemin de Sèvres (Musée du Louvre)
- Paul Huet painted are tasty and country views as possible (Musée de l'Île-de-France, Sceaux)
- Marie Bracquemond, wife of Félix Bracquemond (Le Chemin des Coutures à Sèvres, National Gallery of Canada) linked to the Group of impressionists and employed at the factory, is painted Sèvres. His most famous work: Sur la terrasse de Sèvres avec Fantin-Latour (leg. Caillebotte).
- Constant Troyon born in Sèvres in 1810, first painter of the Barbizon school are painted Chemin de forêt and the Maison Colas, the Prise de la culée du pont de Sèvres. Constant Troyon's parents worked at the manufacture de Sèvres, his father as a painter decorator, and his mother as a buffer. He was encouraged in the field of the arts by his godfather, Riocreux, the curator of the Ceramics Museum of Sèvres and a floral painter. He lived with his mother at the factory until the age of twenty. He first exhibited three paintings at the Paris Salon of 1833, including the Vue de la Maison Colas and the Vue de la Fête de Sèvres.
- Wassily Kandinsky lived for a year in Sèvres, in 1906–1907, at the Rue des Ursulines and then small Rue des Binelles, became Rue Théodore Deck. He painted the La Vie Mélangée.
- Alain Azémar, a painter from Sèvres, living in the Rue de Caves, a street which was the theatre of many "squats" protest-painted scenes of Sèvres on many occasions. Many of his watercolours were commissioned and are displayed by the city hall.

==== Sèvres and philately ====
The French Post Office has developed several times Sèvres à l'Honneur:

On 25 March 1957, a postage stamp was issued with a face value of 30.00 Francs, honouring the Manufacture Nationale de Sèvres, drawn and engraved by Pierre Munier.

On 10 January 2009, a postage stamp was issued with a face value of €0.55, representing a Quimper flat oval earthenware, displayed by the Museum of Sèvres.

==== Sèvres and television ====
The city of Sèvres is the scene for the filming of the French television series Fais pas ci, fais pas ça.

=== Personalities linked to the commune ===
- Andrew Albicy basketball player
- Demba Ba – Senegalese international football player
- Maurice Béné (1884–1960), politician
- André Bizette-Lindet, sculptor, died in Sèvres in 1988
- Yamoudou Camara – French football player
- Manu Chao – Hispano-French musician
- Issiar Dia – Senegalese international football player
- Pierre Louis Félix Lanquetot (1880–1974) – French brigadier general
- Allan Linguet (born 1999), footballer
- Benoit Mozin (1769–1857), French composer, died in Sèvres
- Iliana Rupert (born 2001), basketball player
- Georges Salles (1889–1966), art historian, was born in Sèvres
- Jean-Pierre Vernant (1914–2007), historian, died in Sèvres
- Karim Ziani – Algerian international football player

=== Heraldry, logo and motto ===
Arms of Sèvre	The arms of Sèvre are blazoned : Azure a bridge of wood two batteries or on waves argent issuing from base, surmounted by a huchet covered or virole and enguiche sable, to the chief or a branch of laurel and a palm in double saltire sable, displayed two vases azure overloaded each a Fleur-de-lis or.

== Notable ==
- Nansy Damianova

== See also ==
- Communes of the Hauts-de-Seine department
- Porcelain
- Sèvres syndrome

== Bibliography ==
- Sèvres [Sèvres]. Mémoire en images (in French). éditions A. Sutton. May 2000. ISBN 2842534794.
- Mercier, Pierre (1975). Sèvres en cartes postales anciennes [Sèvres in old postcards] (in French). Zaltbommel, Netherlands: Bibliothèque européenne. preface by Georges Lenormand (mayor of Sèvres).
- Whitehead, John (2010). Sèvres sous Louis XV 1740 - 1770 [Sèvres under Louis XV 1740–1770] (in French). éditions Courtes-Longues. ISBN 978-2352900603.
- "Jardies, Gambetta and Balzac". Gallica (in French).
