= Auguste Duport =

French playwright (1777–1843)

- Born: François Auguste Duport; 22 January 1777; Paris
- Died: 5 September 1843 (aged 66); Amboise

Auguste Duport, full name François Auguste Duport, (22 January 1777 – 5 September 1843) was a French playwright.

Originally a carpenter, he embraced literature and his plays were performed at the Théâtre du Gymnase dramatique, at the Théâtre de l'Opéra-Comique and at the Théâtre-Français.

== Selected works ==
- 1820: Le Frère Philippe, opéra comique in one act, with Victor Dourlen
- 1824: Le Beau-frère, ou la Veuve à deux maris, comédie-vaudeville in one act, with Paul Duport and Amable de Saint-Hilaire,
- 1824: Une journée de Charles V, comédie in one act and in prose, with P. Duport
- 1834: Le Marchand forain, opéra-comique in three acte, with Eugène Planard

== Bibliography ==
- Annuaire dramatique de la Belgique, volumes 5 à 6, 1843 (obituary) (Read online)
