= Victor Dourlen =

French composer and music teacher

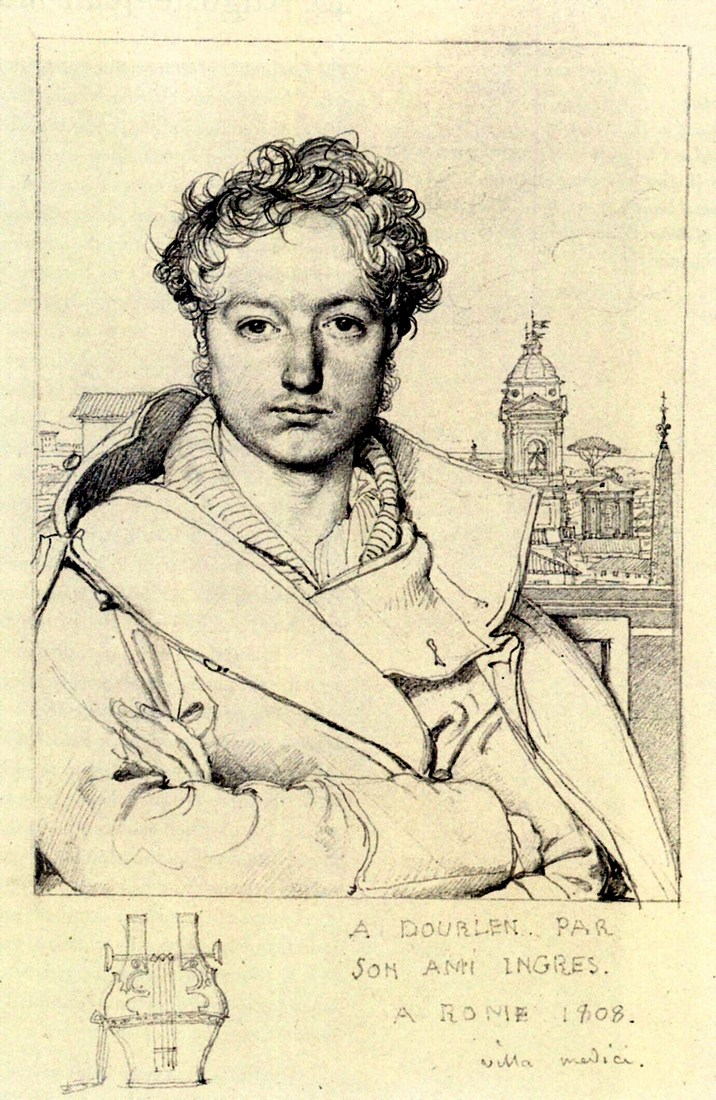
Portrait of Victor Dourlen, 1808, by Ingres

Victor Charles Paul Dourlen (3 November 1780 – 8 January 1864) was a French composer and music teacher at the Conservatoire de Paris during the first half of the nineteenth century. He is primarily known as a theorist on account of his treatises on harmony, based on the methods of Charles Simon Catel, which were widely used as reference works, especially his Traité d'harmonie (c. 1838), the Traité d'accompagnement pratique (c. 1840), and his Méthode élémentaire pour le pianoforte (c. 1820).

== Biography ==
Victor Dourlen was born in Dunkerque. He entered the Paris Conservatory in 1799 at the age of 19, becoming a pupil of Charles-Simon Catel (harmony), François-Joseph Gossec (counterpoint), and Benoit Mozin (piano). He became a teacher of elementary singing at the institution in 1800.

In 1805, he won the Prix de Rome for musical composition with his cantata Cupidon pleurant Psyché. Although he was prevented by war from going to Rome immediately, his opera Philoclès was performed at the Opéra-Comique in October 1806. However, with only four performances, the opera was not successful. Dourlen then went to Rome in 1807, and on July 14 his Te Deum for the Battle of Friedland was performed, followed in 1808 by the Dies irae, another large-scale cantata.

On his return to Paris, Dourlen produced several comic operas, all public failures, including Linnée (1808), La Dupe de son Art (1809), and Cagliostro (1810). In 1816, he was appointed full professor of harmony and counterpoint, a position he held until 1842. Among his pupils were Charles-Valentin Alkan, François Bazin, Louis Désiré Besozzi, Alexandre Goria, Henri Herz, Félix Le Couppey, Antoine François Marmontel, Joseph O'Kelly, and Ambroise Thomas. His only operatic success was Le Frère Philippe (1818) after a libretto by Auguste Duport, which was performed 91 times. His last opera, Le Petit souper (1822) became a public fiasco for the all too liberal depiction of the French king François I and was consequently banned by the French censors. From then on, Dourlen did not write any further opera but concentrated on teaching and writing theoretical treatises.

In 1838, Dourlen was made a chevalier of the Legion d'honneur. He died in Paris.

== Selected works ==
=== Operas ===
- Philoclès (text by Justin Gensoul), 2 acts (1806)
- Linnée, ou Le Mines de Suède (Jean-Élie Bédéno Dejaure), 3 acts (1808)
- La Dupe de son Art, ou Les Deux amants (Louis-Charles Sapey), 1 act (1809)
- Cagliostro, ou La Séduction (Emmanuel Dupaty / Jacques-Antoine de Révéroni Saint-Cyr), 3 acts (act 1 by Dourlen, acts 2 and 3 by Anton Reicha) (1810)
- Plus heureux que sage (Louis Mézières-Miot), 1 act (1816)
- Le Frère Philippe (Auguste Duport), 1 act (1818)
- Le Mariage en poste (Pierre Adolphe Capelle) (1818, not performed)
- À deux de jeu (Paul de Kock), 1 act (1818, not performed)
- Marini, ou Le Muet de Venise (Étienne Joseph Bernard Delrieu), 3 acts (1819)
- La Vente après décès (Charles-Guillaume Étienne), 1 act (1821)
- Le Petit souper, ou La Belle féronnière (Jean-Baptiste-Rose-Bonaventure Violet d'Épagny), 1 act (1822)

=== Cantatas ===
- Scène d'Alcyone (text by Antoine Vincent Arnault), for voices and orchestra (1804)
- Psyché et l'amour (A. V. Arnault), for voices and orchestra (1805)

=== Sacred choral works ===
- Te Deum, for choir and orchestra (1807)
- Dies irae, for choir and orchestra (1808)

=== Instrumental music ===
- La Bataille de Marengo. Sonate militaire, for piano (1800)
- Sonates, Op. 1, for piano (n. d.)
- Piano Concerto, Op. 3
- Piano Trio, Op. 4
- Trois Sonates, Op. 5, for violin and piano
- Sonates faciles, Op. 6, for piano
- Sonate à quatre mains, Op. 10, for 2 pianists
- Grande sonate à quatre mains, Op. 12, for 2 pianists
- Fantaisie sur "Bélisaire", for piano
- Fantaisie en duo, for harp and piano
- Pot-pourri sur des airs de Jean de Paris, for piano

=== Writings ===
- Méthode élémentaire pour le pianoforte (c. 1820)
- Traité d'harmonie, contenant un cours complet tel qu'il est enseigné au Conservatoire de Paris (c. 1838)
- Traité d'accompagnement (c. 1840)
- Principes d'harmonie et tableau général de tous les accords, de leur origine, leur préparation, leur renversement (n. d.)

== See also ==
- List of music students by teacher
