= Constant Pierre =

French musicologist

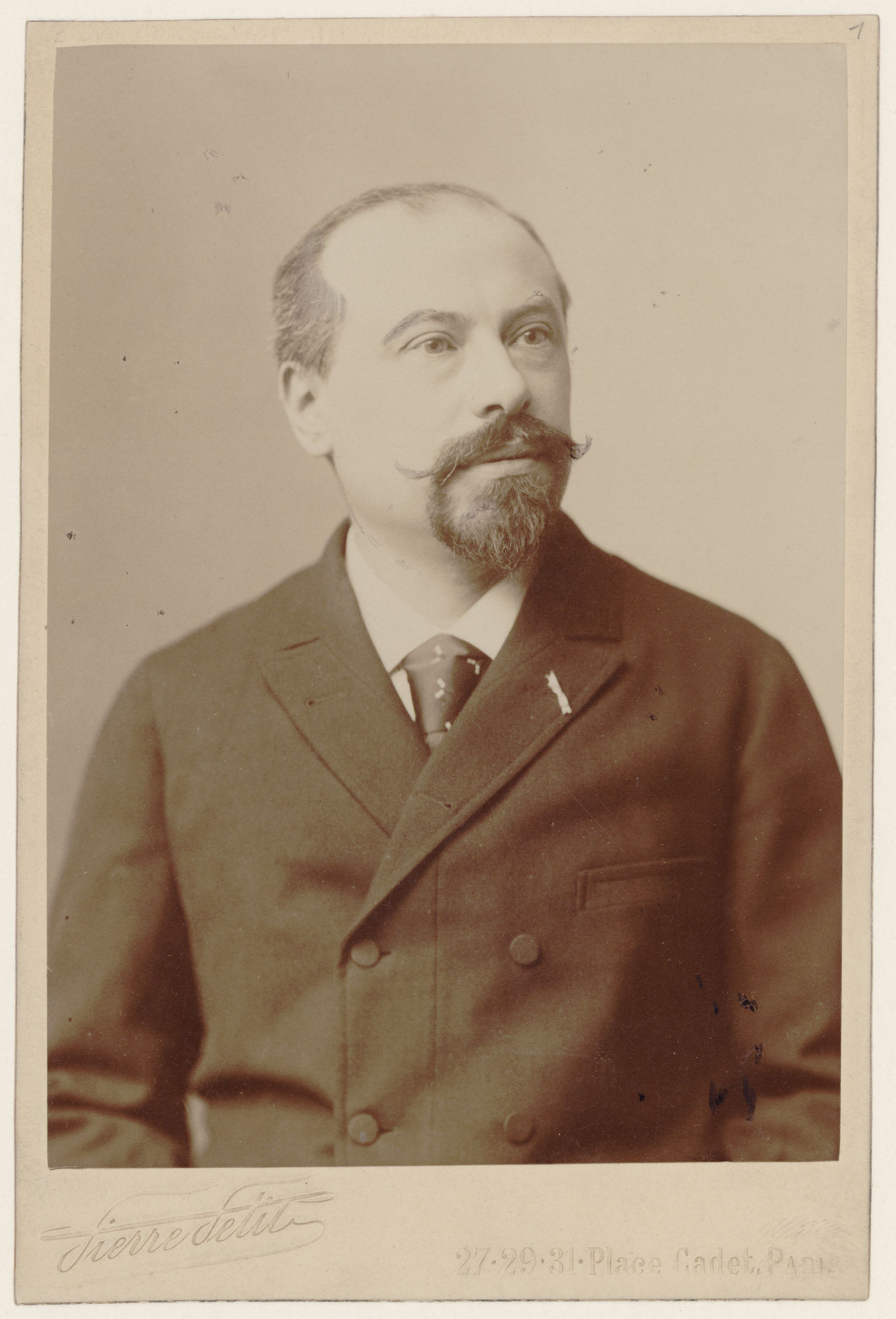
Constant Pierre in 1890, photographed by Pierre Petit

Constant Pierre (24 August 1855 – 12 February 1918) was a French musicologist.

== Early life and career as a bassoonist ==
Born Constant-Victor-Désiré Pierre in Passy, near Paris, he entered the Conservatoire de Paris in 1878 and studied bassoon, winning certificates of merit in 1880 (second) and 1881 (first). From 1878 to 1879 he played with the orchestras of the Folies Bergère, the Skating-Théâtre, and the Théâtre-Lyrique (at the Ventadour and the Gaîté). From 1881 to 1882 he played with the orchestras of the Folies-Dramatiques and the Théâtre de la Renaissance. Subsequently, he played with the orchestras of the Opéra Comique, the Théâtre de l'Odéon, and the Comédie-Française, among others.

== Administrator and journalist ==
Pierre was a clerk in the Ministry of War from 1876 to 1880, and at the Paris Conservatory, beginning in 1881. He was an assistant secretary at the Conservatory from 1900 to 1910.

He also wrote for a number of music journals, including Le monde musical, where he was also an editor, and received an award from the Société des Compositeurs in 1889 and the Bordin prize of the Institut de France in 1900 and 1905.

== Musicologist ==
As a musicologist he published studies on the music of the French Revolution and the history of the Paris Conservatory up to 1900, which are still important sources of information concerning these subjects due to their thoroughness and accuracy.

He died in Paris.

== List of publications ==
- 1887: La ‘Marseillaise’: comparaison des différentes versions. Paris: Lacombe. OCLC 42859049, 503959557.
- 1889: Histoire de l’orchestre de l’Opéra (manuscript in the Bibliothèque de l'Opéra)
- 1890: La facture instrumentale à l’Exposition universelle de 1889. Paris: Librairie de l'Art indépendant. OCLC 1871823.
- 1893: Les facteurs d’instruments de musique, les luthiers et la facture instrumentale. Paris: Sagot. Copy at the Internet Archive.
- 1894: Le magasin de décors de l’Opéra rue Richer: son histoire (1781–1894). Paris: Bibliothèque de la Revue dramatique et musicale. Copy at Gallica.
- 1894: "La musique à la fête du 14 juillet 1794", Revue dramatique et musicale, vol. ii (1894), pp. 608–613.
- 1895: B. Sarrette et les origines du Conservatoire national de musique et de déclamation. Paris: Delalain Frères. Copy at Google Books.
- 1895: L’école de chant de l’Opéra, 1672–1807. Paris. OCLC 503959510.
- 1895: Le Magasin de musique à l’usage des fêtes nationales et du Conservatoire. Paris: Fischbacher. Copy at the Internet Archive.
- 1898: Sur quelques hymnes et faits de la Révolution. Paris: Imprimerie Nationale. Copy at Gallica.
- 1899: "L'Hymne à l'Etre suprême enseigné au peuple par l'Institut national de musique", La Révolution française: revue d'histoire moderne et contemporaine, vol. xliii (1899), pp. 54–64.
- 1899: Musique des fetes et ceremonies de la revolution francaise: Oeuvres de Gossec, Cherubini, Lesueur, Mehul, Catel, etc. Paris: Imprimerie Nationale. Copy at the Internet Archive.
- 1899: Notes inédites sur la musique de la Chapelle Royale (1532–1790). Paris: Bureau d'édition de la Schola cantorum. OCLC 16728960, 54170839.
- 1899: Histoire du Concert spirituel 1725–1790 (manuscript at the Bibliothèque nationale de France). Published 1975, Paris: Société française de musicologie. OCLC 1638380. Internet resource: OCLC 591030071.
- 1900: Le Conservatoire national de musique et de déclamation. Documents historiques et administratifs. Paris: Imprimerie Nationale. 1031 pages. Copy at Google Books.
- 1903: "Le Conservatoire National de Musique", Revue d'histoire et de critique musicales, vol. iii (1903), pp. 313–334.
- 1904: Les hymnes et chansons de la Révolution: aperçu général et catalogue avec notices. Paris: Imprimerie Nationale. Copy at Gallica.
- 1904: "Notes sur les chansons de la période révolutionnaire", Revue d'histoire et de critique musicales, vol. iv (1904), pp. 179–186.
