= Ferdinand de Villeneuve =

French playwright (1801–1858)

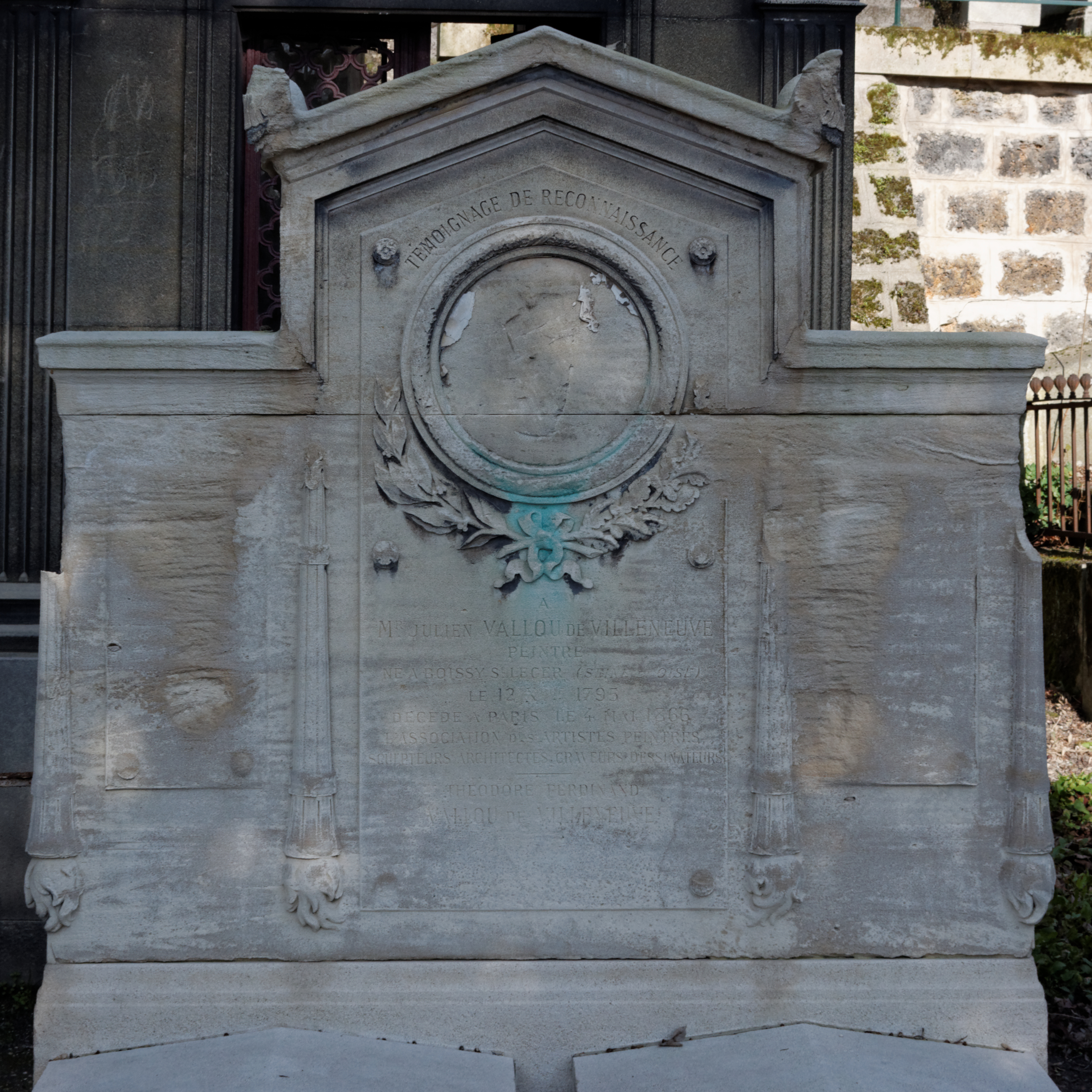
- Ferdinand de Villeneuve and his brother Julien's grave at the Père Lachaise Cemetery
- Born: Théodore-Ferdinand Vallou de Villeneuve; 5 June 1801; Boissy-Saint-Léger, France
- Died: 27 September 1858 (aged 57); Paris, France
- Burial place: Père Lachaise Cemetery, Paris, France
- Occupation: Dramatist
- Years active: 1822–1855

Ferdinand de Villeneuve (5 June 1801 – 27 September 1858) was a 19th-century French playwright.

== Short biography ==
He made his debut in the theatre at the age of 21 by partnering with Charles Dupeuty, and began to be successful from 1823 onwards. In 1825, he founded the newspaper La Nouveauté with Dupeuty, Amable de Saint-Hilaire and Musnier Desclozeaux, a publication which became a daily.

Co-director of the Théâtre de la Porte Saint-Martin with Anténor Joly from December 1835, he then directed, still with Joly, the Théâtre de la Renaissance in 1838 with its own funds.

His plays were presented on several 19th-century Parisian stages, including the Théâtre des Folies-Dramatiques, the Théâtre du Palais-Royal, the Théâtre du Vaudeville, and the Théâtre des Variétés.

The painter and photographer Julien Vallou de Villeneuve was his brother.

== Works ==
- 1822: L'Arracheur de dents, one-act folie-parade, mingled with couplets, with Charles Dupeuty
- 1822: Fille et garçon, ou la Petite orpheline, one-act comédie-vaudeville, with Dupeuty
- 1822: Le Premier prix, ou les Deux artistes, comédie-vaudeville in one act, with Dupeuty
- 1823: L'Actrice, comédie-vaudeville in one act, with Dupeuty
- 1823: Mon ami Christophe, comédie-vaudeville in one act, with Dupeuty and W. Lafontaine
- 1823: Le Oui des jeunes filles, comédie-vaudeville in one act, imitée de l'espagnol, with Jouslin de La Salle
- 1823: Le Sergent de Chevert, vaudeville historique in one act, with Dupeuty
- 1824: Les Acteurs à l'essai, comédie-vaudeville-épisodique in one act, with Dupeuty
- 1824: Léonide ou La Vieille de Suresne, comédie vaudeville in three acts, with Dupeuty and Amable de Saint-Hilaire
- 1824: Les Modistes, tableau-vaudeville in one act, with Charles-Gaspard Delestre-Poirson and Dupeuty
- 1824: Ourika ou la Négresse, drama in one act, with Dupeuty
- 1824: La Petite somnambule, comédie-vaudeville in one act, with Dupeuty
- 1824: Pierre et Marie, ou le Soldat ménétrier, comédie-vaudeville in one act, with Dupeuty and Langlé
- 1824: Le Tableau de Téniers, ou l'Artiste et l'ouvrier, vaudeville in one act, with Dupeuty and Maurice Alhoy
- 1824: Un jour à Dieppe, à-propos-vaudeville, with Saint-Hilaire, Dupeuty and Langlé
- 1825: Alice, ou les Six promesses, vaudeville in one act, with Dupeuty and Saint-Hilaire
- 1825: Les Deux tailleurs, ou la Fourniture et la façon, comédie-vaudeville in one act, with Dupeuty and Jouslin de La Salle
- 1825: Nicaise, ou le Jour des noces, comédie-vaudeville in one act, with Dupeuty
- 1826: L'Anonyme, comédie-vaudeville in two acts, with Dupeuty and Jouslin de La Salle
- 1826: La Dette d'honneur, comédie vaudeville in two acts, with Dupeuty and Langlé
- 1826: Le Soldat en retraite, ou les Coups du sort, drama in two acts, with Jouslin de La Salle and Dupeuty
- 1826: Le Vieux pauvre, ou le Bal et l'incendie, melodrama in three acts and extravaganza, with Dupeuty and Ferdinand Laloue
- 1827: Gérard et Marie, comédie vaudeville in one act, with Étienne Arago
- 1827: Le Hussard de Felsheim, comédie-vaudeville in three acts, with Saint-Hilaire and Dupeuty
- 1827: La Fleuriste, comédie-vaudeville in one act, with Étienne Arago
- 1827: Monsieur Botte, comédie-vaudeville in three acts, with Dupeuty
- 1828: La Grande duchesse, comédie-vaudeville in one act, with Dupeuty and Saintine
- 1828: Les Poletais, comédie-vaudeville in two parts, with Saintine and Dupeuty
- 1828: L'Art de se faire aimer de son mari, comédie-vaudeville in three acts, with Saintine and Dupeuty
- 1828 Les dix francs de Jeannette, with Armand-François Jouslin de La Salle
- 1828: L'Enfant et le vieux garçon, ou la Réputation d'une femme, comédie en vaudevilles in one act, with Armand Desvergers and Charles Varin
- 1828: Guillaume Tell, drame-vaudeville in three acts, with Dupeuty and Saintine
- 1828: Henri IV en famille, comédie-vaudeville in one act, with Auguste Pittaud de Forges and Louis-Émile Vanderburch
- 1828: Le Pauvre Arondel, ou les Trois Talismans, vaudeville-féerie in two acts, with Arago
- 1828: Le Sergent Mathieu, comédie-vaudeville in three acts, with Saintine and Dupeuty
- 1828: Valentine, ou la Chute des feuilles, drama in two acts, mingled with songs, with Saint-Hilaire
- 1828: Yelva ou L'orpheline russe, vaudeville in two parts, with Desvergers and Eugène Scribe
- 1829: La jeunesse de Marie Stuart, drama in two parts, with Vanderburch
- 1829: La Maison du faubourg, comédie-vaudeville in two acts, with Vanderburch
- 1829: Le Mariage par autorité de justice, comedy in two acts, with Antoine Simonnin
- 1829: Mathieu Laensberg, comédie-vaudeville in two acts, with Bourgeois and Vanderburch
- 1829: La Paysanne de Livonie, comédie historique in two acts, mingled with songs, with Saintine and Vanderburch
- 1830: À-propos patriotique, with Michel Masson
- 1830: Le Congréganiste, ou les Trois éducations, comédie-vaudeville in three acts, with Auguste Anicet-Bourgeois
- 1830: Le Collège de *** [Reichenau], souvenirs de la Suisse, en 1794, comédie-vaudeville, with Adolphe de Leuven and Masson
- 1830: Le Marchand de la rue Saint-Denis, ou le Magasin, la mairie et la cour d'assises, comédie-vaudeville in three acts, with Brazier
- 1830: Le Moulin de Jemmapes, vaudeville historique in one act, with de Leuven and Masson
- 1831: L'audience du Prince, comédie-vaudeville in one act, with Anicet Bourgeois and Charles de Livry
- 1831: Angélique et Jeanneton, comédie-vaudeville in four acts, with Dupeuty and Saintine
- 1831: Les Bouillons à domicile, revue-vaudeville in one act, with de Lurieu and de Livry
- 1831: La Caricature, ou les Croquis à la mode, album in seven pochades, with de Lurieu and de Livry
- 1831: L'Entrevue, ou les Deux impératrices, comédie-vaudeville in one act, with Masson and Saintine
- 1831: La Jardinière de l'Orangerie, comédie-vaudeville in one act, with Masson
- 1831: Les Pilules dramatiques, ou le Choléra-morbus, revue critique et politique in one act
- 1831: Robert-le-Diable, à-propos-vaudeville, with Saintine
- 1831: Le Secret d'état, comédie-vaudeville in one act, with Eugène Sue and Édouard Magnien
- 1831: La Vieillesse de Stanislas, drame-vaudeville in one act, with Saint-Hilaire and Masson
- 1832: La ferme de Bondi, ou Les deux réfractaires, episode de l'Empire in four acts, with de Lurieu and Masson
- 1832: Le Bateau de blanchisseuses, tableau-vaudeville in one act, with Masson and de Livry
- 1832 La Chanteuse et l'ouvrière, comédie-vaudeville in four acts, with Saintine
- 1832: Sara, ou l'Invasion, conte allemand in two acts, mingled with vaudeville, with de Leuven and Masson
- 1833: La Révolte des femmes, vaudeville in two acts, with de Livry
- 1833: Santeul ou Le chanoine au cabaret, vaudeville in one act, with Brazier and Léon Lévy Brunswick
- 1833: Les Deux frères, comedy by Kotzebue, translated by Patrat, remise in two acts and in vaudeville, with Masson
- 1833: La fille de Dominique, comédie vaudeville in one act, with de Livry
- 1833: Les Locataires et les portiers, vaudeville in one act, with Brazier and de Livry
- 1834: Le Triolet bleu, comédie-vaudeville in five acts, with de Lurieu and Masson
- 1834: Lionel, ou Mon avenir, comédie-vaudeville in two acts, with de Livry
- 1834: Un bal de domestiques, vaudeville in one act, with de Livry
- 1835: Micheline, ou L'heure de l'esprit, opéra comique in one act, with Masson and Saint-Hilaire
- 1835: Les infidélités de Lisette, drame vaudeville in five acts, with Nicolas Brazier and de Livry
- 1835: On ne passe pas ! ou le Poste d'honneur, vaudeville in one act, with Masson
- 1835: Le Ménage du savetier, ou la Richesse du pauvre, comédie-vaudeville in one act, with Jouslin de La Salle
- 1835: Micheline, ou L'heure de l'esprit, opéra comique in one act, with Masson and Saint-Hilaire
- 1836: La Grue, fabliau mêlé de chant, with Charles Rondeau and de Livry
- 1837: La Résurrection de Saint Antoine, à propos-vaudeville in one act, with Emmanuel Théaulon and Brazier
- 1837: Le Mémoire de la blanchisseuse, comedy in one act, mingled with couplets, with Brazier and de Livry
- 1838: Mademoiselle Dangeville, comédie in one act, mingled with song, with de Livry
- 1838: L'enfant de la balle, vaudeville in two acts, with Didier
- 1839: Rendez donc service, comédie proverbe in one act, with Masson
- 1840: Cocorico ou La poule à ma tante, vaudeville in five acts, with Masson and Saint-Yves
- 1840: Les pages de Louis XII, comedy in two acts, with Alexandre Barrière
- 1840: Le Mari de la fauvette, opéra comique in one act, with Angel and Veyrat
- 1840: Les marins d'eau douce, vaudeville in one act, with Angel and Veyrat
- 1840: Tout pour les filles rien pour les garçons, vaudeville in two acts, with de Lurieu
- 1841: Voltaire en vacances, comédie vaudeville in two acts, with de Livry
- 1842: Au croissant d'argent, comédie-vaudeville in two acts, with Hippolyte Le Roux
- 1842: Un bas bleu, vaudeville in one act, with Ferdinand Langlé
- 1842: Les batignollaises, vaudeville grivois in one act, with de Lurieu
- 1842: Jaket's club, vaudeville in two acts, with Ernest Jaime
- 1844: Pulcinella, comédie-vaudeville in two acts, with Adolphe d'Ennery
- 1845: L'almanach des 25,000 adresses, comédie-vaudeville in three acts, with Édouard Lafargue
- 1845: La Morale en action, comédie-vaudeville in one act, with Jaime
- 1846: Jean-Baptiste, ou Un cœur d'or, drama in five acts, mingled with songs, with Masson and Frédéric Thomas
- 1846: L'inconnue de Ville-d'Avray, comédie-vaudeville in one act, with Angel
- 1847: L'Homme aux 160 millions, comédie-vaudeville in two acts, with Angel and Xavier Veyrat
- 1849: Lorettes et aristos ou Une soirée au Ranelagh, tableau-vaudeville in one act, with Paul Siraudin
- 1850: Un fantôme, comédie-vaudeville in one act, with Lafargue
- 1850: Jean Bart, pièce historique in five acts, with Forges
- 1854: La Femme à trois maris, comédie-vaudeville in one act
- 1854: Une sangsue, comédie vaudeville in one act, with Langlé
- 1855: Bonaparte à l'École de Brienne, play in three acts and four tableaux, with Gabriel de Lurieu and Michel Masson
- 1855: Deux vieilles gardes, opéra bouffe in one act, with Léo Delibes

== Bibliography ==
- Joseph Marie Quérard, La France Litteraire, T.X, 1839, p. 196-199 (Read on line)
- Joseph Fr. Michaud, Louis Gabriel Michaud, Biographie universelle ancienne et moderne, vol.43, 1843, p. 480
- Louis Gustave Vapereau, Dictionnaire universel des contemporains, 1870, p. 1819
