= Jean-Toussaint Merle =

French journalist and playwright

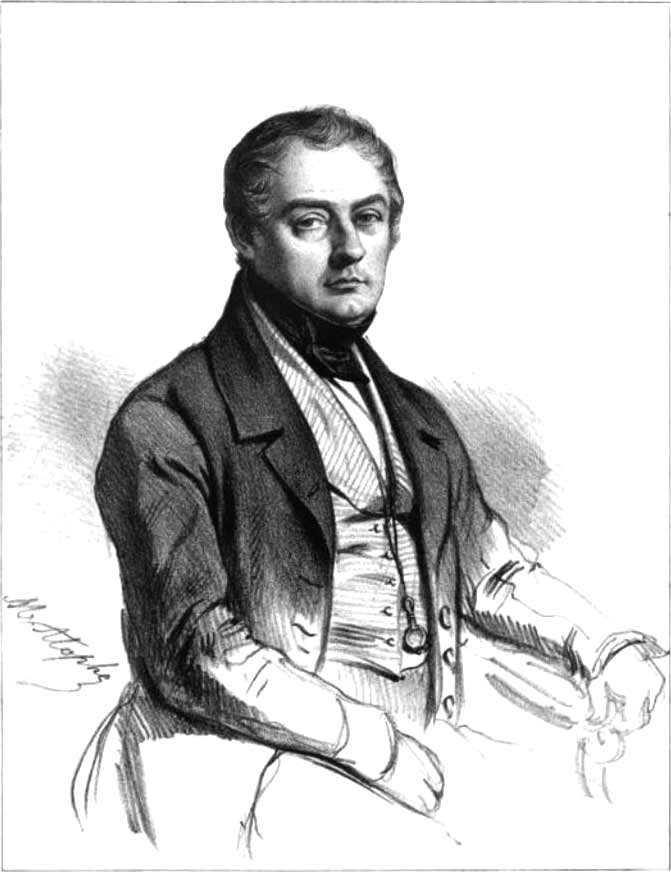
- Born: 10 June 1785; Montpellier, France
- Died: 27 February 1852 (aged 66)
- Occupations: Playwright and journalist
- Spouse: Marie Dorval

Jean-Toussaint Merle (10 June 1785 – 27 February 1852) was a French playwright and journalist.

== Biography ==
Merle had a good education at the Central School of the department of Hérault before arriving in Paris in 1803. At first an employee at the Ministry of Interior, he soon left the position for military service, and returned to Paris only towards the end of 1808. He then made his debut in literature. His amiable character and easy spirit made him a reputation for indolence which seems in little agreement with the activity of his literary life. He put his name to more than one hundred and twenty plays, almost all of them made in collaboration.

In turn attached to various newspapers, he has written numerous articles in the Mercure de France, la Gazette de France, Le Diable boiteux, Le Nain jaune, etc. For a long time he wrote the dramatic serial of la Quotidienne. He was both a spiritual critic and pleasant writer.

Managing director of the théâtre de la Porte-Saint-Martin from 1822 to 1826, he presented many plays, some of which were successful, at the théâtre du Vaudeville, théâtre des Variétés-Amusantes and théâtres des boulevards. He married the famous actress Marie Dorval, the widow of Allan-Dorval. While he accompanied the maréchal de Bourmont as secretary and historiographer, he had the opportunity to write Anecdotes historiques et politiques pour servir à l’histoire de la conquête d’Alger, 1831.

== Publications ==
=== Theatre ===
- 1810: Monsieur Grégoire ou Courte et bonne, one-act vaudeville;
- 1812: Le Ci-Devant Jeune Homme, one-act comedy;
- 1814: La Jeunesse de Henri IV, ou la Chaumière béarnaise, one-act comedy;
- 1816: Les Deux Vaudevilles, ou la Gaieté et le sentiment;
- 1817: L’Heureuse Moisson, ou le Spéculateur en défaut with Carmouche and Frédéric de Courcy, one-act vaudeville mingled with distincts, Théâtre de la Porte-Saint-Martin, September
- 1819: Le Banc de sable, ou les Naufragés français with Frédéric Dupetit-Méré, Eugène Cantiran de Boirie, melodrama in three acts in prose, Théâtre de la Porte-Saint-Martin, 14 April;
- 1820: La Cloyère d’huitres, ou les Deux Briquebec' with Carmouche and Frédéric de Courcy, one-act comédie en vaudevilles, Théâtre de la Porte-Saint-Martin, 25 January;
- 1850: Marie Stuart, drama in three acts, imitated from Schiller;
- 1822: Le Lépreux de la vallée d’Aoste, melodrama in three acts with Hyacinthe Decomberousse, Théodore Baudouin d'Aubigny, Théâtre de la Porte-Saint-Martin, 13 August;
- 1822: La carte à payer, one act vaudeville;
- 1822: La Lampe merveilleuse, féerie burlesque in two acts;
- 1823: Les Invalides ou Cent ans de gloire, tableau militaire in two acts with Boirie, Henri Simon and Ferdinand Laloue written to celebrate the return of H.R.H. the Duke of Angoulême, music by Louis Alexandre Piccinni, Théâtre de la Porte-Saint-Martin, 15 December;
- 1824: Ourika ou l’Orpheline africaine, melodrama in one act and in prose with Frédéric de Courcy, music by Charles-Guillaume Alexandre, Théâtre de la Porte-Saint-Martin, 3 April;
- 1825: L’Agent de change ou Une fin de mois, drama in three acts imitated from Beaumarchais, with Théodore Baudouin d'Aubigny and Maurice Alhoy, Théâtre de la Porte-Saint-Martin;
- 1825: Le Vieillard d’Ivry, ou 1590 et 1825, vaudeville in two scenes with Marc-Antoine-Madeleine Désaugiers and Ferdinand Laloue, ballet Jean Coralli, on the occasion of the coronation of Charles X, Théâtre de la Porte-Saint-Martin, 7 June;
- 1826: Le Monstre et le Magicien, melodrama in three acts composed for the English mime Cook;
- Préville et Taconnet, vaudeville, etc.

=== Journalism ===
- L’Espion anglais, ou Correspondance entre deux milords sur les mœurs publiques et privées des Français, Paris, Léopold Collin, 1809, 2 vol. in-8°;
- Lettre à un compositeur français sur l’état actuel de l’Opéra, Paris, Barba, 1827, in-8°, 44 p.
- De l’Opéra, Paris, Baudouin, 1827, in-8°, 52 p.
- Du marasme dramatique en 1829, 1829, in-8°;
- Anecdotes historiques et politiques pour servir à l’histoire de la conquête d’Alger, 1831, in-8°.

=== Erxcepts collections ===
- Mémoires historiques, littéraires et critiques de Bachaumont, de 1762 à 1786, Paris, 1808, 3 vol. in-8°;
- Esprit du Mercure de France depuis son origine (1672) jusqu’en 1792, Paris, 1811, 3 vol . in-8°.

== Sources ==
- Gustave Vapereau, Dictionnaire universel des littératures, Paris, Hachette, 1876, (p. 1383).
- François-Joseph Fétis, Biographie universelle des musiciens, vol.5, Brussels, Meline, Cans and Cie, 1865, (p. 378).
