= Constant Ménissier =

French playwright (1793–1878)

Jean-Constant Menissier (1793 in Paris – 12 October 1878) was a 19th-century French playwright. His theatre plays were performed on the most important Parisian stages of the 19th century, including Théâtre du Gymnase, Théâtre de la Porte Saint-Martin, Théâtre des Célestins and Théâtre du Vaudeville.

== Works ==
- 1813: Les deux ermites ou La confidence, comédie en vaudeville in 1 act, with Charles-Gaspard Delestre-Poirson, imitated from August von Kotzebue
- 1813: Le Château d'If, comedy in 1 act and with vaudevilles
- 1819: La créole, comédie en vaudeville in 1 act, with Delestre-Poirson
- 1819: Douvres et Calais, ou Partie et revanche, comédie en vaudeville in 2 acts, with Emmanuel Théaulon,
- 1820: Caroline, comédie en vaudeville in one act, with Eugène Scribe
- 1820: Les Folies du jour, extravaganza in 1 act, in vaudevilles, with A. Martin and Théaulon
- 1821: Le Château de Chambord, hommage in 1 act and in vaudevilles
- 1821: Les Suites d'un bienfait, with Martial Aubertin and Alexandre Martin
- 1822: La diligence attaquée, ou L'auberge des Cévennes, with Ferdinand Laloue and Ernest Renaud
- 1822: La Fille à marier ou La Double éducation, comédie en vaudeville in 1 act, with Laloue and Amable de Saint-Hilaire
- 1822: Un mois après la noce, ou le Mariage par intérêt, comédie en vaudeville en 1 act, with E. Renaud
- 1822: Le Petit Don Quichotte, proverbe by Carmontelle arranged in vaudeville
- 1823: Les deux fermiers, ou la Forêt de Saint-Vallier, melodrama in 3 acts extravaganza, with Alexandre Martin
- 1823: L'Antichambre d'un médecin, scènes épisodiques mingled with couplets
- 1823: Les deux forçats, folie in one act, with Laloue and Renaud
- 1823: Les deux sergens, pièce anecdotique in 1 act, with A. Martin
- 1823: Les Trois Trilby, folie in 1 act and in prose, with A. Martin and E. Renaud
- 1823: Le Précepteur dans l'embarras, comédie en vaudeville in 1 act
- 1823: La Maison incendiée, ou les Enfants du charbonnier, mélodrame anecdotique in 1 act, with E. Renaud
- 1823: Le Roulier, mimodrame in 3 acts, with Laloue and A. de saint-Hilaire
- 1824: Le commissionnaire, melodrama en 3 acts, with Eugène Cantiran de Boirie and Ferdinand Laloue
- 1824: Le Passeport, comédie en vaudeville in 1 act, with E. Renaud
- 1824: Le Colonel de hussards, melodrama in 3 acts, extravaganza
- 1828: Les Frères d'armes, ou la Parole d'honneur, tableau anecdotique in 1 act and in vaudeville extravaganza, with A. Martin
- 1829: L'illusion, drame lyrique in 1 act, with Henri de Saint-Georges
- 1831: L'Abbé de L'Épée, ou le Muet de Toulouse, historical play in 2 periods and in 9 tableaux, mingled with singing
- 1831: Une première faute, drama mingled with songs in 4 acts and in 7 tableaux
- 1832: Brune et blonde, tableau in 1 act, mingled with songs
- 1832: Les Fils du rempailleur, comedy in 2 acts, mingled with couplets
- 1832: Le Livre vert ou Esprit et jugement, Vaudeville-féerie in 4 acts and 7 tableaux, with Paul Duport
- 1833: L'Enseigne, ou la Destinée, drama mingled with singing, in 3 acts and 6 tableaux, followed with an epilogue, from Contes de l'atelier, by Michel Masson
- 1834: L'Exposition de 1834, revue commerciale in 1 act, mingled with couplets
- 1834: Hénin, ou le Pêcheur de Boulogne, historical fact in 1 act, mingled with songs
- 1835: Un roi en vacances, comédie en vaudeville en 3 acts and 6 tableaux, with Pierre-Joseph Charrin
- 1835: Le Coin du feu, play in 4 acts and 7 tableaux, mingled with songs
- 1836: Le Dahlia magique, ou le Nain bleu, pièce féerie in 4 acts and 11 tableaux, preceded by a prologue
- 1838: Le bourgeois de Reims, opera comique in one act, with Henri de Saint-Georges
- 1838: Une journée aux Champs-Élysées, tableau in one act, with H. de Saint-Georges and Léon Rabbe
- 1840: Le Marché des Innocetns, ou l'Inconnu, drama in 4 acts
- 1844: Les Trois amis, drama in 3 acts

== Bibliography ==
- Jean Marie Querard, Les supercheries litteraires devoilees. Galerie des auteurs apocryphes, 1853, (p. 290)
