= Jenny Vertpré =

French stage actress

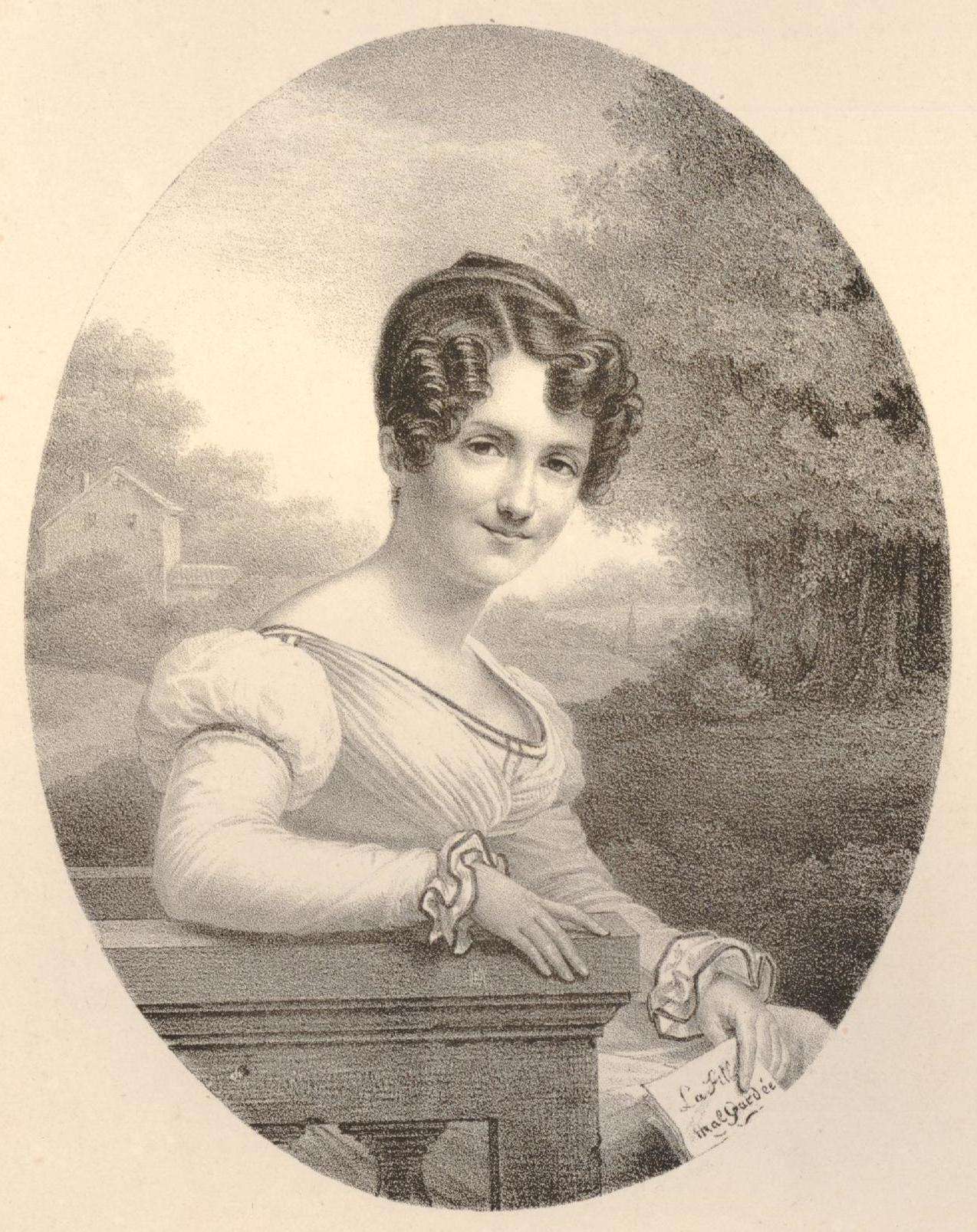
- Born: Françoise Fanny Vausgien; 6 September 1797; Bordeaux
- Died: 3 November 1865 (aged 68); Passy
- Occupation: Actress
- Spouse: Pierre Carmouche

Jenny Vertpré, real name Françoise Fanny Vausgien, (6 September 1797 – 3 November 1865) was a 19th-century French stage actress. During her childhood, she performed under the name of Jenny, at the Théâtre du Vaudeville and then became a leading actress of Théâtre des Variétés (1821-1825), then of the Théâtre du Gymnase (1825-1834). She became the theatre manager of the St James's Theatre in London, she still performed at the Théâtre de l'Odéon in 1839, the year when she eventually retired.

She married Pierre Carmouche in 1832.

== Roles ==
- 1811: Princess Abricotine in Riquet à la houpe by Antoine Simonnin, Théâtre de la Gaîté
- 1818: Simplette in Le Petit Chaperon rouge by Frédéric Dupetit-Méré and Nicolas Brazier, Théâtre de la Porte Saint-Martin
- 1820: Lovette in Le Vampire by Charles Nodier, Théâtre de la Porte Saint-Martin
- 1826: Poleska in La Lune de miel by Eugène Scribe, Mélesville and Carmouche, Théâtre du Gymnase
- 1826: Madame Pinchon in Le Mariage de raison by Eugène Scribe and Antoine-François Varner, Théâtre du Gymnase
- 1828: Christine in La Reine de seize ans by Jean-François Bayard, Théâtre du Gymnase
- 1833: Nadèje in Un trait de Paul I or le Czar et la Vivandière by Eugène Scribe and Paul Duport, Théâtre du Gymnase
- 1835: Nichon in La Petite Nichon ou la Petite Paysanne de la Moselle by Pierre Villiers and Jean-Guillaume-Antoine Cuvelier, Théâtre des Variétés
- 1837: Betzy in Le Chevalier d'Éon by Jean-François Bayard and Dumanoir, Théâtre des Variétés
- 1838: la marquise in Les Dames de la halle by Charles Dupeuty and Louis-Émile Vanderburch, Théâtre des Variétés
- 1838: Madame Pinchon in Madame et Monsieur Pinchon by Bayard, Dumanoir and Adolphe d'Ennery, Théâtre des Variétés

== Bibliography ==
- Biographies des artistes dramatiques par nos meilleurs auteurs contemporains, 1848 (Read on line)
- Edmond-Denis De Manne, Charles Ménétrier, Galerie historique des acteurs français, 1877, (p. 208)
- Eugène Bouvy, Jenny Vertpré (1797-1865), Gounouilhou, 1910
- Henry Lyonnet, Dictionnaire des comédiens français, 1911, (p. 703)
