= Pierre Carmouche =

French playwright and chansonnier

- Born: Pierre-François-Adolphe Carmouche; 9 April 1797; Lyon
- Died: 9 December 1868 (aged 71); Paris
- Occupations: Playwright, chansonnier
- Spouse: Jenny Vertpré

Pierre Carmouche (9 April 1797 - 9 December 1868) was a French playwright and chansonnier. He wrote more than 200 successful plays, comedies, comédies en vaudevilles and texts for opéras comiques, in collaboration with diverse authors - Brazier, Dumersan, Mélesville, de Courcy, etc.

In 1824 he married the actress Jenny Vertpré.

He also collected a rich library, bequeathed in part to marshal Canrobert.

== Theatre ==
- Les Poissons d'avril, ou le Charivari, comédie en vaudevilles, with Émile Cottenet, Théâtre de la Porte-Saint-Martin, 1 April 1816.
- Le Bateau à vapeur, comedy in one act, mingled with couplets, with Émile Cottenet, Philibert Rozet, Théâtre de la Porte Saint-Martin, 1816.
- L'Heureuse Moisson, ou le Spéculateur en défaut, comédie en vaudevilles in 1 act mingled with couplets, with Jean-Toussaint Merle and Frédéric de Courcy, Théâtre de la Porte-Saint-Martin, September 1817.
- La Cloyère d'huitres, ou les Deux Briquebec, comédie en vaudevilles in 1 act, with Frédéric de Courcy and Jean-Toussaint Merle, Théâtre de la Porte-Saint-Martin, 25 January 1820
- La Petite Corisandre, comédie en vaudevilles in 1 act, with Henri Dupin and Frédéric de Courcy, Théâtre de la Porte-Saint-Martin, 11 October 1820.
- Chacun son numéro, ou le Petit Homme gris, comédie en vaudevilles in 1 act, with Théodore Baudouin d'Aubigny and Boirie, Théâtre de la Porte-Saint-Martin, 6 December 1821.
- Le Coq de village, tableau vaudeville by Charles-Simon Favart with changes from Carmouche and Frédéric de Courcy, Théâtre de la Porte-Saint-Martin, 16 July 1822.
- La Réconciliation, ou la Veille de la Saint-Louis, tableau-vaudeville in 1 act, with Frédéric de Courcy and Ferdinand Laloue, Théâtre de la Porte-Saint-Martin, 23 August 1822.
- Le Grenadier de Fanchon, comédie en vaudevilles in 1 act, with Emmanuel Théaulon and Nicolas Brazier, Théâtre des Variétés, 13 December 1824.
- In vino veritas, comédie en vaudevilles in 1 act, with Saint-Ange Martin and Frédéric de Courcy, Théâtre de la Porte-Saint-Martin, 24 April 1825.
- Les Filets de Vulcain ou le Lendemain d'un succès, foly-vaudeville en 1 act, with Armand-François Jouslin de La Salle and Dupin, Théâtre de la Porte-Saint-Martin, 15 July 1826.
- Cinq heures du soir, ou le Duel manqué, comédie en vaudevilles in 1 act, with Emmanuel Théaulon and Mélesville, Théâtre des Variétés, 4 September 1827.
- Le Mariage impossible, comédie en vaudevilles in 2 acts, with Mélesville, Théâtre des Variétés, 1828.
- Le puff. Comédie en vaudevilles in 3 tableaux, with Varin and Louis Huart, 1838.
- Deux-Ânes, comédie en vaudevilles in 1 act, with Mélesville, Théâtre du Palais Royal, 1842.

== Sources ==
- Louis Gustave Vapereau, Dictionnaire universel des littératures, Paris, Hachette, 1876, p. 381
