= Alphonse de Chavanges =

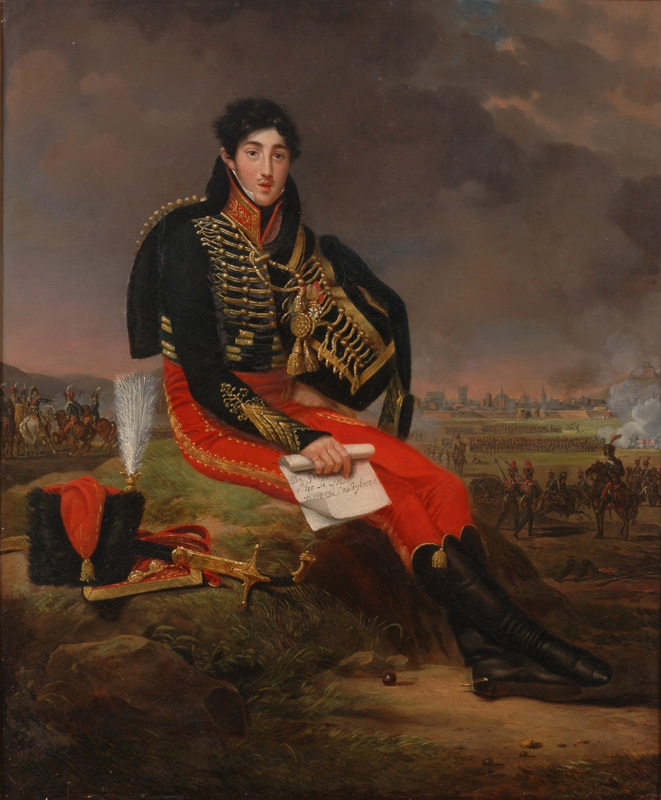
- Portrait of Alphonse de Chavanges, aide-de-camp of Marshal Augereau, by Adèle Romany, Salon of 1812
- Born: Alphonse de Bourlon; 4 June 1791; Paris
- Died: 20 October 1831 (aged 40); Paris
- Occupations: Dramatist, playwright

Alphonse de Chavanges (real name Alphonse de Bourlon) (4 June 1791, Paris – 20 October 1831, Paris) was a French officer and dramatist.

== Biography ==
Stepbrother and aide-de-camp of Marshal Augereau, colonel and battalion chief, his plays have been performed on the most famous Parisian stages during the 19th century : Théâtre de la Porte-Saint-Martin, Théâtre de l'Ambigu-Comique, Théâtre du Vaudeville etc.

== Works ==
- 1824: L'avocat et le médecin, 1 act comedy, with Armand-François Jouslin de La Salle
- 1824: La Famille du charlatan, 1 act folie-vaudeville, with Jouslin de La Salle and Maurice Alhoy
- 1824: Le colonel de Hussards, 3 act melodrama, with Constant Ménissier
- 1824: Jane-Shore, 3 act melodrama, with Jouslin de La Salle
- 1824: Le Passeport, 1 act comedy-vaudeville, with Ménissier and Ernest Renaud
- 1825: Le Docteur d'Altona, 3 act melodrama with tableaux, with Hyacinthe Decomberousse and Auguste Maillard
- 1828: Le vieil artiste, ou, La séduction, 3 act melodrama, with Frédérick Lemaître
- 1828: L'Art de se présenter dans le monde, ou Miroir de l'homme de bonne compagnie, with Chollet
- 1829: L'Amour raisonnable, 1 act comedy in prose
- 1829: Lequel Des Deux ?, 1 act comedy, with Chollet
- 1830: Le souvenir, 1 act comedy
- 1834: Une fille d'Eve, 1 act comedy-vaudeville, with Philippe Dumanoir and Camille Pillet, posth.
- 1835: Le poltron, comédie-vaudeville en un acte, avec Jean-François-Alfred Bayard, posth.

== Distinction ==
- Chevalier of the Légion d'honneur, 1810

== Bibliography ==
- Joseph Marie Quérard, La France littéraire, 1828, p. 167
