= Antoine Simonnin =

French writer and dramatist (1780–1856)

Antoine Simonnin (born Antoine-Jean-Baptiste Simonnin; Paris, 11 January 1780 – Paris, 14 May 1856) was a French writer and dramatist.

Simonnin wrote, alone or in collaboration, more than 200 comédies en vaudeville, parodies or fantaisies.

He also published a collection of Chansons sacrées et profanes (1856, in-18).

== Works ==
- Arlequin au café du bosquet, ou la Belle limonadière, vaudeville épisodique, in 1 act;
- Augusta, ou Comme on corrige une jeune personne, two-act comédie en vaudeville, Théâtre des jeunes élèves de M. Louis Comte, 5 December 1832;
- Belz et Buth, folie-vaudeville in 2 acts, with Hilpert, Théâtre du Panthéon, 21 August 1839;
- Caroline de Litchfield, drame-vaudeville in 2 acts and in prose, with Brazier and Carmouche Théâtre de la Porte Saint-Martin, 10 February 1827;
- Catherine II, ou l'Impératrice et le cosaque, play in 2 acts, extravaganza, mingled with couplets, with Théodore Nézel, Théâtre de l'Ambigu-comique, 8 October 1831;
- Couplets, ou Ode lyrique sur la naissance du Roi de Rome;
- Danières à Gonesse, one-act comédie en vaudeville, with Alex Guesdon. Théâtre Montansier, 14 floréal an 13 (4 May 1805);
- David et Goliath, two-act comédie en vaudeville, Théâtre du Panthéon, 7 December 1836;
- Dieu et Diable, ou la Conversion de Madame Dubarry, one-act historical vaudeville, with Nézel, Théâtre de la Gaîté, 28 December 1833;
- Enfant volé, play in 4 periods and 8 scenes, Théâtre des jeunes élèves de M. Comte, 26 August 1835;
- Gilles et Arlequin au Muséum, ou Critique en vaudevilles des tableaux, dessins, sculptures;
- Gilles-Robinson et Arlequin-Vendredi, imitation burlesque de Robinson Crusoé, en 3 actes qui n'en font qu'un, with Alexandre Guesdon, Théâtre des jeunes artistes, 19 vendémiaire an XIV (11 October 1805);
- Gracieuse et Percinet, melodrama féerie in 3 acts with Brazier fils. Théâtre des Troubadours, 28 April 1806;
- Haine aux petits enfants, seconde imitation de ″Haine aux femmes″, one-act comédie en vaudeville, Théâtre de la Gaîté, 28 July 1808);
- Histoire des trois derniers mois de la vie de Napoléon Bonaparte, écrite d'après des documents authentiques, par S***;
- Histoire du voyage du Premier Consul, en l'an XI, dans les départements de la ci-devant Belgique;
- Jeanne la Folle, reine d'Espagne, historical novel;
- Jeannot tout seul, one-act comédie en vaudeville;
- Jonas avalé par la baleine, en quittant les îles Marquises, fantasy play extravaganza in 5 acts and 10 scenes, with Louis and Comte (Théâtre des jeunes élèves du gymnase Choiseul, 19 August 1843);
- Kokoli, ou Chien et chat, folie-vaudeville in 3 acts and 4 scenes, Gymnase-Choiseul, 25 March 1847;
- L'Arlequin et le Pape, historical vaudeville in 1 act, with Théodore N*** (Nézel), Théâtre de l'Ambigu-comique, 4 October 1831;
- L'Art de quitter sa maîtresse, ou les Premiers présents de l'amour, tableau-vaudeville n 1 act, with MM. Nézel, Paris, Gaîté, 18 January 1834;
- L'Artisan, one-act opéra comique, by M. de Saint-Georges, music by M. Halévy, Opéra-Comique, 30 January 1827;
- L'Âne mort et la femme guillotinée, folie-vaudeville in 3 acts, with Théodore N*** (Nézel), Théâtre du Panthéon, 20 June 1832;
- L'Enfance de Louis XII, ou la Correction de nos pères, one-act comédie en vaudeville, with Mélesville, Théâtre du Palais-royal, 10 December 1831;
- L'Enragée de Chaumont, one-act comedy, with Benjamin Antier, Théâtre de la Porte Saint-Martin, 2 November 1829;
- L'Écrivain public, one-act comédie en vaudeville, with Emmanuel Théaulon and de Couray, Théâtre de Madame, 11 June 1827;
- L'Homme de 60 ans, ou la Petite entêtée, one-act comédie en vaudeville, with Achille d'Artois and Ferdinand Laloue, Variétés, 22 June 1824;
- L'Intrigue dans la hotte, one-act comédie en vaudeville, with Armand Gouffé, Théâtre Montansier, 8 February 1806;
- L'Oiseau bleu, mélodrame-féerie in 2 acts and 8 scenes, mingled with singing, music by de Bellon;
- La Belle aux cheveux d'or, mélodrame-féerie in 3 acts, with Brazier fils, Théâtre des Troubadours, 5 March 1806;
- La Bosse du vol, ou le Vase d'or, two-act comédie en vaudeville, Théâtre du Panthéon, 11 January 1837;
- La Cabale au village, comedy in 1 act, mingled with couplets, with R. Alissan de Chazet, Théâtre des Variétés, 12 March 1814;
- La Chambre de Rossini, canevas à l'italienne, mêlé de vaudevilles et de musique nouvelle, with Merle and Achille d'Artois. (Variétés, 21 January 1834;
- La Chevalière d'Éon, ou Une heure de méprise, one-act comédie en vaudeville, with Saint-Marc, Gymnase-dramatique, 27 January 1823;
- La Ci-devant jeune femme, one-acte comedy, mingled with couplets, with et Chazet, Variétés, 24 May 1813;
- La Côte rôtie, ou le Hasard a tout fait, one-act comedy, mingled with couplets, Théâtre de la Gaîté, 7 November 1822;
- La Grammaire en vaudevilles, ou Lettres à Caroline sur la Grammaire française, by S***;
- La Jardinière de Vincennes, mélodrame-vaudeville in 3 acts with Brazier fils. Théâtre des jeunes artistes, 14 March 1807;
- La Jeune comtesse, one-act comédie en vaudeville, with Théodore N*** (Nézel), Théâtre du Panthéon, 23 March 1832;
- La Jeune Fille colère, one-act comédie en vaudeville;
- La Maison du faubourg, two-act comédie en vaudeville, with Ferdinand de Villeneuve and Louis-Émile Vanderburch, Théâtre du Vaudeville, 22 January 1829;
- La Menteuse, comedy in 3 acts, mingled with couplets, Théâtre des anciens élèves de M. Louis Comte, 22 November 1833;
- La Pantoufle de Voltaire, two-act comédie en vaudeville, Théâtre du Temple, 6 May 1836;
- La Papesse Jeanne, vaudeville-anecdote in 1 act, with Théodore N. (Nézel), Théâtre de l'Ambigu-comique, 15 January 1831;
- La Peau de chagrin, ou le Roman en action, extravagance romantique, three-act comédie en vaudeville, with Théodore N*** (Nézel), Théâtre de la Gaîté, 4 November 1832;
- La Petite Revue, ou Quel mari prendra-t-elle ? one-act comédie en vaudeville and in prose des citoyens Théophile Dumersa and Simonnin, Théâtre de Molière, 14-19 vendémiaire an XI);
- La Serinette des dames, ou Étrennes dédiées au beau sexe pour l'an XII;
- La St-Louis des artistes, ou la Fête du Salon, comédie en vaudeville in 1 act by MM. Merle, Simonnin and Ferdinand Laloue, Théâtre de la Porte Saint-Martin, 24 August 1824;
- Le Bonhomme, comedy in 1 act, mingled with couplets, by MM. Simonnin and Carmouche (and J. Pain]. Variétés, 15 September 1826;
- Le Code et l'amour, vaudeville in 1 act, with Merle and M.-N. Balisson de Rougemont. Théâtre de la Porte Saint-Martin, 29 October 1821;
- Le Comte et le représentant, one-act comédie en vaudeville, with Thibouville, Théâtre du Panthéon, 2 June 1838;
- Le Conscrit, one-act comedy en vaudeville, with Merle and Ferdinand Laloue, Théâtre de la Porte Saint-Martin, 20 November 1823; Variétés, 28 April 1824;
- Le Cordonnier de Modène, ou l'Apostille, one-act comédie en vaudeville, Théâtre des jeunes élèves de M. Comte, 3 September 1834;
- Le Cousin Giraud, one-act comédie en vaudeville, with Laloue and Charles Dupeuty. Théâtre des Nouveautés, 24 July 1828;
- Le Cuisinier de Buffon, one-act comédie en vaudeville, with Rougemont and Merle. Théâtre de la Porte Saint-Martin, 29 July 1823;
- Le Cuisinier politique, vaudeville non politique, in 1 act, with Théodore N*** (Nézel), Théâtre de l'Ambigu-comique, 11 June 1832;
- Le Curé et les chouans, comedy in 1 act and in prose, with Théodore N*** (Nézel). Théâtre du Panthéon, 31 May 1832;
- Le Diable à Paris, one-act comédie en vaudeville, with Llaunet. Théâtre Beaumarchais, 31 July 1844;
- Le Doge et le dernier jour d'un condamné ou Le canon d'alarme, vaudeville in 3 scenes;
- Le Garçon d'honneur, imitation de ″La Fille d'honneur″, in 1 acte and vaudevilles, with Frédéric Dupetit-Méré. Théâtre de la Porte Saint-Martin, 13 February 1819, 2 edition;
- Le Grand dîner, tableau-vaudeville in 1 act, with Saint-Georges, Théâtre du Vaudeville, 25 February 1828;
- Le Jugement de Salomon, historical drama in 4 acts and 14 scenes, mingled with song, from the Scriptures; music by M. Lautz, (Gymnase-Choiseul, 12 August 1842;
- Le Lazaret, one-act comédie en vaudeville, with Paul de Kock. Théâtre de l'Ambigu-comique, 13 February 1842;
- Le Maçon poète, comédie-anecdote in 1 act and in vaudevilles, with Du Mersan . Théâtre du Vaudeville, 21 August 1806;
- Le Marchand de chansons, one-act comédie en vaudeville, with Vanderburch. Théâtre de l'Ambigu-comique, 6 May 1837;
- Le Margrave et la grande-duchesse, vaudeville historique in 1 act. Théâtre Comte, 3 October 1840;
- Le Mariage dans une rose, one-act comédie en vaudeville, with B*** (Brazier]. Théâtre de la Gaîté, 25 May 1808;
- Le Mariage de Charles Collé, ou la Tête à perruque, one-act comédie en vaudeville, with Gouffé and Brazier. Théâtre des Variétés, 18–22 October 1809;
- Le Mariage par autorité de justice, comedy in 2 acts, with Devilleneuve. Théâtre de l'Ambigu-comique, 19 September 1829;
- Le Mariage par commission, ou le Seigneur allemand, one-act opéra comique, lyrics by J.-B. Simonnin; music by Brimi. Paris, Opéra-Comique, 7 December 1815;
- Le Marquis de Carabas, ou le Chat botté, folie-féerie in 2 acts, extravaganza, mingled with couplets. Théâtre de la Gaîté, 9 May 1811;
- Le Musicien de Valence, one-act comédie en vaudeville, with Gustave Albitte. Théâtre de la Gaîté, 13 July 1834;
- Le Naturaliste, ou l'Homme fossile, one-act comédie en vaudeville, with Théaulon. Théâtre du Gymnase dramatique, 23 August 1824;
- Le Nouveau mérite des femmes, poème burlesque
- Le Pâtissier usurpateur, historical play in 5 little acts, with Benjamin Antier and Théodore N. (Nézel). Théâtre de la Gaîté, 4 December 1830;
- Le Petit chaperon rouge, pièce féerie in 4 acts and 16 scenes. Théâtre Comte, 14 August 1841;
- Le Petit homme gris, one-act comédie en vaudeville, with Bayard. Théâtre du Gymnase dramatique, 15 March 1845;
- Le Petit monstre et l'escamoteur, folie-parade in 1 act, with de Saint-Georges, music by M. Miller. Théâtre de la Gaîté, 7 July 1826;
- Le Père Jean, comédie-vaudeville in 2 acts, with Marc-Michel. Paris, folies-dramatiques, 3 July 1851;
- Le Pied de bœuf, pièce de résistance, arlequinade-vaudeville in 1 act and in prose with B*** (Brazier). Paris, Troubadours, 21 February 1807;
- Le Porteur d'eau, mimo-drame in 3 acts, with Ferdinand Laloue. Cirque olympique, 26 October 1824;
- Le Soldat et le perruquier, one-act comédie en vaudeville, with Ferdinand Laloue. Théâtre de l'Ambigu comique, 27 July 1824;
- Le Tailleur de Jean-Jacques, comedy in 1 act and in prose, with de Rougemont and Merle. Théâtre de la Porte Saint-Martin, 12 Novembre 1819;
- Le Valet en bonne fortune, ou les Amies de pension, comedy in 1 act, mingled with couplets, with Laloue. Théâtre des Variétés, 11 January 1825;
- Le ″Te Deum″ et le tocsin, ou la Route de Rouen, one-act comédie en vaudeville, with Honoré. Théâtre de la Gaîté, 5 September 1830;
- Lecoq, ou les Valets en deuil, comedy in 1 act mingled with couplets, with R. Alissan de Chazet. Théâtre des Variétés, 19 July 1814;
- Les Cauchoises, one-act comédie en vaudeville. Théâtre du Panthéon, 16 October 1836;
- Les Cris de Paris, tableau Genre poissard in 1 act, mingled with couplets, with Francis baron d'Allarde and Dartois. Théâtre des Variétés, 18 September 1822;
- Les Deux héritages, ou Encore un normand, one-act comédie en vaudeville, with Désaugiers. Théâtre du Vaudeville, 12 February 1827;
- Les Filles à marier, ou l'Opéra de Quinault, comédie en 1 acte, mêlée de couplets;
- Les Hommes de quinze ans, two-act comédie en vaudeville, with Vanderburch. Théâtre Comte, 4 June 1837;
- Les Malheurs et les aventures d'un proscrit;
- Les Mémoires de ma tante, one-act comédie en vaudeville. Théâtre de l'Ambigu-comique, 2 November 1853;
- Les Peintres d'enseignes, ou les Huissiers à la noce, one-act comedy, mingled with couplets. Théâtre de la Gaîté, 23 April 1822;
- Les Petits bas-bleus, ou les Jeunes filles poètes, two-act comédie en vaudeville, les Jeunes élèves du Gymnase Choiseul, 12 February 1844;
- Les Rosières de Paris, one-act comédie en vaudeville, with Brazier and Pierre Carmouche. Théâtre de Madame, 22 April 1825
- Les Vêpres odéoniennes, parodie des Vêpres siciliennes, with Armand d'Artois. Théâtre des Variétés, 22 November 1819;
- Lisette toute seule, ou Ils se trompent tous deux, one-act comédie en vaudeville;
- Magot, ou les Quatre mendians, imitation burlesque de ″Dago, ou les Mendians″, ambigu in 3 little services, orné de balais, etc., with Brazier fils. Théâtre des Troubadours, 19 June 1806;
- Maître Corbeau, ou la Couronne de diamants, pièce fantastique in 5 acts and in 15 scenes, music by MM. Lautz and Peuchot. Gymnase Choiseul, 10 August 1844;
- Misère et gaieté, one-act comedy, mingled with couplets. Théâtre des Variétés, 31 October 1809;
- Mlle Gertrude, ou le Malentendu, one-act comédie en vaudeville. Théâtre des jeunes artistes, 23 July 1806;
- Monsieur et Madame Denis, ou Souvenez-vous en, one-act comedy and in vaudevilles, with B*** (Brazier], followed by the Chanson de M. et Mad. Denis, par Marc-Ant. Désaugiers. Théâtre de la Gaîté, 18 June 1808;
- Napoléon en paradis, one-act comédie en vaudeville, with Benjamin (Antier] and Théodore N. (Nézel). Théâtre de la Gaîté, 17 November 1830;
- Parlez pour moi, one-act comédie en vaudeville and in prose;
- Pauvre enfant, two-act comédie en vaudeville. Théâtre Comte, 2 July 1839;
- Ramponeau ou le Procès bachique, comedy in 1 act, mingled with vaudevilles;
- Riquet à la houpe, mélo-féerie in 2 acts, extravaganza mingled with couplets; music arranged by M. Leblanc. Théâtre de la Gaîté, 28 September 1811;
- Robinson cadet, one-act comédie en vaudeville, with Alexandre Guesdon. Paris, Théâtre de la Cité, 6 vendémiaire, an XIV (28 September 1805;
- Sacrées et profanes, chants et chansons d'époques depuis 1793 jusques et y compris 1856, and other poems;
- Tricotinet, ou Parlez pour moi, one-act comédie en vaudeville;
- Un Marquis d'autrefois, drame-vaudeville in 3 acts, with Valory. Théâtre des folies-dramatiques, 22 May 1833;
- Un Proscrit chez Voltaire, vaudeville anecdotique in 1 act, with Amable de Saint-Hilaire. Théâtre de la Gaîté, 8 May 1836;
- Zerline, ou le Peintre et la courtisane, one-act comédie en vaudeville, with Théodore N*** (Nézel). Théâtre du Panthéon, 1 May 1832.

== Sources ==
- Gustave Vapereau, Dictionnaire universel des littératures, Paris, Hachette, 1876, (p. 1884).
