= Ernest Renaud =

French dramaturge (1799–1827)

Ernest Renaud called Ernest (1799 - 3 July 1827 in Paris) was a French dramatist of the 19th century.

His plays have been performed on the most prestigious Parisian stages during the 19th century: Théâtre du Vaudeville, Théâtre du Gymnase dramatique, Théâtre de l'Ambigu-Comique etc.

He died untimely aged 28.

== Works ==
- 1822 : La diligence attaquée, ou L'auberge des Cévennes, with Ferdinand Laloue and Constant Ménissier
- 1822 : Un mois après la noce, ou le Mariage par intérêt, 1 act comedy-vaudeville, with Ménissier
- 1823 : L'Antichambre d'un médecin, episodic scenes sparsed with distics, with Ménissier
- 1823 : Les deux forçats, 1 act foly, with Ménissier and Laloue
- 1823 : La Maison incendiée, ou les Enfants du charbonnier, 1 act anecdotic melodrama, with Ménissier, 1823
- 1823 : Le Précepteur dans l'embarras, 1 act comedy-vaudeville, with Ménissier
- 1823 : Les Trois Trilby, 1 act folie in prose, with Alexandre Martin and Ménissier
- 1824 : Le Passeport, 1 act comedy-vaudeville, with Alphonse de Chavanges and Ménissier
- 1826 : Le Tambour et la musette, 1 act tableau-vaudeville, with Maurice Alhoy and Armand-François Jouslin de La Salle

== Bibliography ==
- Joseph Marie Quérard, La France littéraire, ou Dictionnaire bibliographique des savants..., vol.7, 1835, (p. 525)
- Joseph Marie Quérard, Charles Louandre, La littérature française contemporaine: XIXth century, 1857, (p. 153)
