= Théodore Baudouin d'Aubigny =

French playwright

Jean-Marie-Théodore Baudouin also d’Aubigny, born in Paris 19 August 1786 - died 1866, was a French playwright.

== Theatre ==
- La Pie voleuse, a play in collaboration with Louis-Charles Caigniez, based on an authentic event. Théâtre de la Porte Saint-Martin, 29 April 1815. The play later served as the base for the 1817 opera La gazza ladra by Rossini.
- Le Barbier de la cité ou Un pied dans l'abîme, melodrama in 3 acts and in prose, ballets by Frédéric-Auguste Blache, music by Louis Alexandre Piccinni, Théâtre de la Porte Saint-Martin, 22 August 1816;
- Les Paratonnerres ou les Bulles de savon, comedy in 1 act and in prose, with Boirie, Théâtre de la Porte Saint-Martin, 21 November 1821;
- Chacun son numéro ou le Petit Homme gris, comédie en vaudevilles in 1 act, with Carmouche and Boirie, Théâtre de la Porte Saint-Martin, 6 December 1821;
- Le Lépreux de la vallée d'Aoste, melodrama in 3 acts, with Hyacinthe Decomberousse and Jean-Toussaint Merle, Théâtre de la Porte Saint-Martin, 13 August 1822;
- Les Deux Sergents, melodrama in 3 acts, with Auguste Maillard, Théâtre de la Porte Saint-Martin, 20 February 1823;
- L'Agent de change ou Une fin de mois, drama in 3 acts imitated from Beaumarchais, with Jean-Toussaint Merle and Maurice Alhoy, Théâtre de la Porte Saint-Martin, 1825.

== Sources ==
- Pierre Marie Michel Lepeintre Desroches, Suite du Répertoire du Théâtre Français : comédies en prose I-XVIII, t. 47, Paris, Veuve Dabo, 1823, {(p. 137-138).
