= Ferdinand Laloue =

French dramatist, librettist and theatre producer (1794–1850)

Ferdinand Laloue (1794 in Passy – 27 September 1850) was a French dramatist, librettist and theatre producer.

Administrator of the Théâtre du Cirque-Olympique, he also was director of the Hippodrome and the théâtre des Délassements comiques. His onerous plays with fastuous settings were performed on the most important Parisian stages (Théâtre des Folies-Dramatiques, Théâtre de la Porte-Saint-Martin, Théâtre du Châtelet, Théâtre des Variétés etc.).

== Works ==
- Le Fort de la halle, vaudeville in 1 act, with Michel-Nicolas Balisson de Rougemont and Pierre Carmouche, 1821
- Le Petit Georges, ou la Croix d'honneur, comedy in 1 act, 1821
- La Bataille de Bouvines, ou le Rocher des tombeaux, mimodrame in 3 acts, with René Perin, 1822
- L'Arabe hospitalier, melodrama in 1 act, 1822
- La diligence attaquée, or L'auberge des Cévennes, with Constant Ménissier and Ernest Renaud, 1822
- La Fille à marier ou La Double éducation, comédie en vaudevilles in 1 act, with Ménissier and Saint-Hilaire, 1822
- La guerre ou la parodie de la paix, burlesque tragedy in five acts in verses, with Théaulon and Armand d'Artois, 1822
- L'Oiseleur et le pêcheur, ou la Bague perdue, vaudeville in 1 act, with Carmouche and X.-B. Saintine, 1822
- La Réconciliation, ou la Veille de la Saint-Louis, tableau-vaudeville in 1 act, with Carmouche and Frédéric de Courcy, 1822
- Les deux forçats, folie en 1 acte, with Ménissier and Renaud, 1823
- Les Invalides, ou Cent ans de gloire, tableau militaire in 2 acts, mingled with couplets, with Jean-Toussaint Merle, 1823
- Le Dévouement filial, ou Marseille en 1720, mimodrame in 1 act, with Henri Simon, 1823
- Le Fermier d'Arcueioisl, vaudeville in 1 act, with Nicolas Brazier and Carmouche, 1823
- Le Roulier, mimodrame in 3 acts, with Ménissier and Saint-Hilaire, 1823
- Les Marchands forains, ou le Mouton, vaudeville in 1 act, 1823
- La Saint-Louis au bivouac, scènes militaires, mingled with couplets, with Merle and Simon, 1823
- Le commissionnaire, with Pierre-Jean Aniel, Eugène Cantiran de Boirie and Constant Ménissier, 1824
- Le Conscrit, vaudeville in 1 act, with Jean-Toussaint Merle and Antoine Jean-Baptiste Simonnin, 1824
- L'homme de 60 ans ou la petite entêtée, comedy vaudeville in 1 act, with Armand d'Artois and Simonnin, 1824
- Melmoth, ou l'Homme errant, mimodrame in 3 acts, with Saint-Hilaire, 1824
- Le Porteur d'eau, mimodrame in 3 acts, with Théaulon and Simonnin, 1824
- Le soldat et le perruquier, comédie en vaudevilles in 1 act, with Michel-Nicolas Balisson de Rougemont and Simonnin, 1824
- Les Deux cousins, comédie en vaudevilles in 3 acts, with Paul Duport and Amable de Saint-Hilaire, 1825
- Monsieur Charles, or Une matinée à Bagatelle, comédie en vaudevilles in 1 act, with Merle, 1825
- Le Valet en bonne fortune, ou les Amies de pension, comedy in 1 act, mingled with couplets, with Simonnin, 1825
- L'Égoïste par régime, comédie en vaudevilles in 1 act, with Charles de Longchamps, 1826
- Le Vieillard d'Ivry, or 1590 and 1825, vaudeville in 2 tableaux, with Marc-Antoine Désaugiers, Jean Coralli and Merle, 1825
- Le Prisonnier amateur, comedy mingled with couplets, with Armand d'Artois, Alexis Decomberousse and Frédérick Lemaître, 1826
- Le Vieux pauvre, ou le Bal et l'incendie, melodrama in 3 acts, with Charles Dupeuty and Ferdinand de Villeneuve, 1826
- Le Bon père, comedy in 1 act, with Achille and Armand d'Artois, 1827
- L'Ami intime, comedy in 1 act, with Emmanuel Théaulon and Achille d'Artois, 1828
- Le Cousin Giraud, comédie en vaudevilles in 1 act, with Charles Dupeuty and Simonnin, 1828
- L’Éléphant du roi de Siam, play in 3 acts and 9 parts, with Adolphe Franconi, Léopold Chandezon and Albert Monnier, 1829
- La prise de la Bastille; Passage du Mont Saint-Bernard, with Nézel, 1830
- L'Empereur, événements historiques in 5 acts and 18 tableaux, with Franconi and Auguste Le Poitevin de L'Égreville, 1830
- Les Lions de Mysore, three-act play with 7 tableaux, 1831
- Mingrat, melodrama in 4 acts, 1831
- Dgenguiz-Khan or La conquête de la Chine, 1837
- Le géant ou David et Goliath, biblical play in 4 acts and 9 tableaux, with Bourgeois, 1838
- Le Sac à charbon, ou le Père Jean, comédie en vaudevilles in 1 act, with Carmouche, 1838
- Le Lion du désert, play in three acts and six tableaux, with Fabrice Labrousse, 1839
- Bélisario, ou L'opéra impossible, with Carmouche, 1839
- Le Bambocheur, vaudeville in 1 act, with Carmouche, 1839
- Les Pêcheurs du Tréport, vaudeville in 1 act, with Bourgeois, 1839
- Les Pilules du diable, féerie in 3 acts and 20 tableaux, with Bourgeois, 1839
- L'Uniforme du grenadier, tableau militaire in 1 act, with de Courcy, 1839
- Le mirliton enchanté, 1840
- L'orangerie de Versailles, comédie en vaudevilles in 3 acts, with Bourgeois, 1840
- Mazagran, bulletin de l'armée d'Afrique, play in 3 acts, with Charles Desnoyer, 1840
- La Ferme de Montmirail (episodes from 1812 to 1814), pièce militaire in 3 acts and 4 tableaux, with Labrousse, 1840
- Le Dernier vœu de l'Empereur, 5 tableaux, with Labrousse, 1841
- Anita la bohémienne, vaudeville in three acts, with Pierre Carmouche, 1841
- Le Marchand de bœufs, vaudeville in 2 acts, with Bourgeois, 1841
- M. Morin, vaudeville in 1 act, with Labrousse, 1841
- Murat, play in 3 acts and 14 tableaux, with Labrousse, 1841
- Pauline ou Le Châtiment d'une mère, drama in 3 acts, with Labrousse, 1841
- Le Prince Eugène et l'Impératrice Joséphine, 1842
- Le Chien des Pyrénées, play in 2 acts and 6 tableaux, with Labrousse, 1842
- Un rêve de mariée, vaudeville in 1 act, with Bourgeois, 1842
- Don quichotte et Sancho Pança, play in 2 acts and 13 tableaux, with Bourgeois, 1843
- Le Palais-royal et la Bastille, drame-vaudeville in 4 acts, with Labrousse, 1843
- Brisquet ou L'héritage de mon oncle, with Théodore Nézel, 1843
- Le Vengeur, action navale de 1794, play in 3 acts, with Labrousse, 1843
- La Corde de pendu, féerie in 3 acts and 19 tableaux, with Auguste Anicet-Bourgeois, 1844
- L'Empire, play in three acts and 18 tableaux, with Labrousse, 1845
- Louis XVI et Marie-Antoinette, drama in 6 acts and 10 tableaux, with Labrousse, 1849
- Rome, drama in 5 acts and 12 tableaux, with Labrousse, 1849

== Bibliography ==
- Joseph Marie Quérard, Félix Bourquelot, Charles Louandre, La littérature française contemporaine. XIXe siècle, 1852, (p. 560) Lire en ligne
- Guy Dumur, Histoire des spectacles, 1965, (p. 1864)
