= Frédéric de Courcy =

French dramatist, poet and chansonnier

Frédéric de Courcy, born Frédéric Charlot de Courcy (16 August 1796, Paris – 6 May 1862, Paris) was a French dramatist, poet and chansonnier.

== Life ==
The son of Augustin Charlot de Courcy and Adélaïde Vallet, in 1826 he became sous-chef of La Poste's personnel department (under Jean-Baptiste Tenant de Latour).

He was the author of several comédies en vaudevilles, often in collaboration, including :

- 1817: L'Heureuse Moisson, ou le Spéculateur en défaut, one-act comédie en vaudevilles mingled with couplets by Jean-Toussaint Merle, Pierre Carmouche and Frédéric de Courcy, Théâtre de la Porte-Saint-Martin, (September)
- 1820: La Cloyère d'huitres, ou les Deux Briquebec, onr-act comédie en vaudevilles by Pierre Carmouche, Frédéric de Courcy and Jean-Toussaint Merle, Théâtre de la Porte-Saint-Martin, (25 January)
- 1820: La Petite Corisandre, one-act comédie en vaudevilles by Henri Dupin, Frédéric de Courcy and Carmouche, Théâtre de la Porte-Saint-Martin, 11 October)
- 1822: Le Coq de village, tableau-vaudeville by Charles-Simon Favart avec des changements de Carmouche et Frédéric de Courcy, Théâtre de la Porte-Saint-Martin, (16 July)
- 1822: La Réconciliation ou la Veille de la Saint-Louis, one-act tableau-vaudeville by Carmouche, Frédéric de Courcy and Ferdinand Laloue, Théâtre de la Porte-Saint-Martin, (23 August)
- 1823: Les Deux Aveugles
- 1824: Ourika ou l'Orpheline africaine, drama in one act and in prose by Frédéric de Courcy and Jean-Toussaint Merle, music by Charles-Guillaume Alexandre, Théâtre de la Porte-Saint-Martin, (3 April)
- 1825: In vino veritas, one-act comédie en vaudevilles by Saint-Ange Martin, Frédéric de Courcy and Carmouche, Théâtre de la Porte-Saint-Martin, 24 April
- 1832: Le Courrier de la malle, one of the first appearances of the famous character Joseph Prudhomme, played by the character's creator Henry Monnier
- 1835: Les Infortunes de Jovial, huissier chansonnier, voyage en trois actes et 6 tableaux mingled with singing, dances and body catching, by Emmanuel Théaulon and Frédéric de Courcy, Théâtre des Folies-Dramatiques, (22 October)
- 1836: Les Chansons de Desaugiers by Frédéric de Courcy and Emmanuel Théaulon, Théâtre du Palais-Royal
- 1837: Crouton, chef d'école, ou le Peintre véritablement artiste, tableau in one act mingled with couplets by Emmanuel Théaulon, Gabriel de Lurieu and Frédéric de Courcy, Théâtre des Variétés, (11 April)
- 1851: Le Vol à la roulade
- Le Voyage à Vienne, etc.

Until his death, he lived with his partner Adélaïde Alexandrine Verteuil. They never married, and had two sons – Alexandre Frédéric, known as an illustrator, and dramatist Charles Henry.

== Sources ==
- Dictionnaire de biographie française.
- Notice on Généanet
