= Amable de Saint-Hilaire =

French dramatist (born 1799)

Amable Vilain de Saint-Hilaire (born 30 November 1799) was a French dramatist whose plays have been performed on the most important Parisian stages of the 19th century: Théâtre du Vaudeville, Théâtre des Variétés, Théâtre de la Renaissance, etc.

== Selected works ==
- 1820: Écoutons ! ! !, scènes improvisées, on the occasion of the birth of H.R.H. Mgr the duke of Bordeaux, with Emmanuel Lepeintre
- 1820: La pièce d'emprunt ou le compilateur, comedy in 1 act, mingled with vaudevilles, with Edmond Crosnier, 1820
- 1821: Jocrisse paria, tragédie burlesque in 1 act and in verses, with Crosnier
- 1821: Le Solitaire ou l'Exilé du mont Sauvage, melodrama in three acts, à grand spectacle
- 1822: La Fille à marier ou La Double éducation, comédie en vaudevilles in 1 act, with Ferdinand Laloue and Constant Ménissier
- 1822: Le Meurtrier, ou le Dévouement filial, historical melodrama in 3 acts, à spectacle, with Crosnier
- 1823: La Chasse au renard, vaudeville in 1 act, with Adèle Daminois
- 1823: Le Roulier, mimodrama in 3 acts, with Laloue and Ménissier
- 1823: Louise, ou le Père juge, melodrama in 3 acts, à spectacle, with Hyacinthe Decomberousse
- 1823: Tringolini, ou le Double enlèvement, melodrame comic in 3 acts et à grand spectacle
- 1824: Le 27 septembre 1824, vaudeville in 1 act and à grand spectacle, with Henri Franconi
- 1824: Le Beau-frère, ou la Veuve à 2 maris, comédie en vaudevilles in 1 act, with Auguste Duport and Paul Duport
- 1824: Le Château perdu, ou le Propriétaire supposé, comédie en vaudevilles in 1 act, with Hyacinthe Decomberousse
- 1824: Léonide, ou la Vieille de Suresne, comédie en vaudevilles in 3 acts, with Dupeuty and de Villeneuve
- 1824: Melmoth, ou l'Homme errant, mimodrama in 3 acts and à grand spectacle
- 1825: Alice, ou les Six promesses, vaudeville in 1 act, with Charles Dupeuty and Ferdinand de Villeneuve
- 1825: L'Heureux jour, ou Une halte de cavalerie, scènes militaires, mingled with couplets
- 1825: Les Deux cousins, comédie en vaudevilles in 3 acts, with P. Duport and Ferdinand Laloue
- 1825: L'Insouciant, ou la Rencontre au port, comédie en vaudevilles in 1 act, with P. Duport
- 1826: Midi, ou l'Abdication d'une femme, comédie en vaudevilles in 1 act, with P. Duport and Édouard Monnais
- 1827: Irène ou la prise de Napoli, melodrama in 2 acts, with Antony Béraud and Léopold Chandezon
- 1828: Valentine, ou la Chute des feuilles, drama in 2 acts, mingled with songs, with de Villeneuve
- 1831: Encore un préjugé, ou les Deux éligibles, comédie en vaudeville in 3 acts, with Léon Lévy Brunswick and Victor Lhérie
- 1831: M. Mayeux, ou Le Bossu à la mode, à propos de bosses in 3 tableaux, mingled with vaudevilles, with Eugène Hyacinthe Laffillard et Emmanuel Lepeintre
- 1831: La Veillée, opera-comique in 1 act, with P. Duport, 1831
- 1831: La Vieillesse de Stanislas, drame-vaudeville in 1 act, with Masson and de Villeneuve
- 1835: L'habit ne fait pas le moine, comédie en vaudevilles in 3 acts, with P. Duport
- 1835: Cosimo, opéra bouffon in 2 acts, with Paul Duport
- 1835: Micheline, ou L'heure de l'esprit, opéra comique in 1 act, with Michel Masson and de Villeneuve
- 1836: Le hussard de Felsheim, comédie en vaudevilles in 3 acts, with Dupeuty and de Villeneuve
- 1836: Le Diadesté, ou la Gageure arabe, opéra comique in 2 acts, with Léon Pillet
- 1836: Un proscrit chez Voltaire, vaudeville anecdotique in 1 act, with Antoine Jean-Baptiste Simonnin
- 1837: Nathalie, comédie en vaudevilles in 1 act, with P. Duport
- 1838: Turcs et bayadères, ou le Bal de l'Ambigu, folie de carnaval in 2 tableaux mingled with couplets, with Saint-Yves
- 1839: Chasse royale, opera in two acts
- 1839: Deux jeunes femmes, drama in 5 acts and in prose
- 1839: Revue et corrigée, comédie en vaudevilles in 1 act
- 1844: Nelly, drame-vaudeville in 3 acts
- 1845: Le cheval du diable, drame fantastique in 5 acts and 14 tableaux
- 1845: Les éléphants de la pagode, play in three acts extravaganza, with Auguste Anicet-Bourgeois
- 1846: Henri IV, drame historique en 3 acts, 16 tableaux and prologue, with Michel Delaporte
- 1850: Blanche et Blanchette, drame-vaudeville in 5 acts
- 1850: Cravate et jabot, comédie en vaudevilles in 1 act, with Duport
- 1850: Deux anges, ou mère et fille, drame-vaudeville in 3 acts
- 1850: L'Hôtesse de Saint-Éloy, drame-vaudeville in 3 acts
- 1850: S. A. Badigeon 1er, vaudeville-bouffe in 2 acts
- 1851: La circassienne, comedy mingled with songs, in 1 act
