= Eugène Cantiran de Boirie =

- Born: Jean-Bernard-Eugène Cantiran de Boirie; 22 October 1785; Paris
- Died: 14 December 1837 (aged 52); Paris
- Occupation: Dramatist

Eugène Cantiran de Boirie, real name Jean-Bernard-Eugène Cantiran de Boirie, (22 October 1785 – 14 December 1837) was a French dramatist.

Boirie was the son of a chief clerk of the stewardship of Paris, who at the time of the Revolution, spent the remainder of his fortune buying the Théâtre des Jeunes-Artistes.

Boirie's first play was produced when he was 20 years old. This and subsequent plays were created with the help of several other authors.

After his father died, Boirie became owner of the Théâtre des jeunes Artistes, but was stripped of his ownership by the imperial decree that abolished many theaters. He then was the dramaturge for four years of the théâtre de l’Impératrice, a position he lost at the time of the First Restoration. In 1822, he became dramaturge of the théâtre de la Porte-Saint-Martin, at t he request of Jean-Toussaint Merle.

After retiring from the théâtre de la Porte-Saint-Martin, Boirie died in a nursing home located in the Saint-Marcel neighborhood of Paris.

== Theatre ==
- Storb et Verner, ou Les Suites d'un duel (with P.-J.-A. Bonel), drama in 3 acts, théâtre de la Porte-Saint-Martin, 6 April 1815 : La Marquise de Gange, ou Les Trois Frères (with Léopold Chandezon), melodrama in 3 acts and in prose, inspired by the Causes Célèbres, théâtre de la Gaité, 18 November 1815
- Jean sans peur, duc de Bourgogne, ou le Pont de Montereau (with Léopold Chandezon), melodrama in 3 acts and in prose, théâtre de la Porte-Saint-Martin, December 1815
- Le Banc de sable, ou les Naufragés français (with Frédéric Dupetit-Méré and Jean-Toussaint Merle), melodrama in 3 acts in prose, théâtre de la Porte-Saint-Martin, 14 April 1819
- Chacun son numéro, ou le Petit Homme gris, comédie en vaudevilles in 1 act (with Pierre Carmouche, Théodore Baudouin d'Aubigny), théâtre de la Porte-Saint-Martin, 6 December 1821
- Le Château de Kenilworth (with Henri Lemaire), 3-acts melodrama after Walter Scott, théâtre de la Porte-Saint-Martin, 23 March 1822
- Les Deux Forçats, ou la Meunière du Puy-de-Dôme (with Carmouche and Alphonse André Véran), melodrama in 3 acts, théâtre de la Porte-Saint-Martin, 3 October 1822
- Les Invalides ou Cent ans de gloire, tableau militaire in 2 acts (with Jean-Toussaint Merle, Henri Simon and Ferdinand Laloue) to celebrate the return of H.R.H. the duke of Angoulême, music by Louis Alexandre Piccinni, théâtre de la Porte-Saint-Martin, 15 December 1823
- Le Commissionnaire (with Ferdinand Laloue and Constant Ménissier), melodrama in 3 acts, théâtre de la Porte-Saint-Martin, 10 June 1824
- L'Oncle et le neveu, ou les Noms supposés (with Pierre Tournemine), comédie en vaudevilles in 1 act, théâtre de la Porte-Saint-Martin, 14 February 1826

== Sources ==
- Biographie universelle, ancienne et moderne : revue bibliographique universelle, t. 4, Paris, Madame C. Desplaces, 1854, 700 p. read on line
