= Frédéric Dupetit-Méré =

French playwright and dramatist (1785–1827)

- Born: 16 September 1785; Former 6th arrondissement of Paris
- Died: 4 July 1827 (aged 42); Paris
- Occupations: Dramatist, playwright
- Years active: 1804-1827

Frédéric Dupetit-Méré (16 September 1785 – 4 July 1827), was a French playwright and dramatist.

Dupetit-Méré, alone and in collaboration with Ducange, Michel-Nicolas Balisson de Rougemont, Nicolas Brazier and others, wrote many plays, historical and heroical melodramas, vaudevilles and féeries, almost all of them published under the name "Frédéric".

== Theatre ==
- Le Vieux Poète, vaudeville in 1 act, Paris, 16 November 1804.
- L’Amant rival, comédie en vaudevilles, en 1 acte, with Pelletier, Paris, Théâtre des Jeunes-Artistes, 19 May 1805.
- La Femme à trois visages, ou les Condottiéris, melodrama in 3 acts, with Eugène Cantiran de Boirie, Paris, Théâtre de l'Ambigu-Comique, 9 October 1805.
- Le Vainqueur d’Austerlitz, ou le Retour du héros, entertainment extravaganza, with Pelletier, Paris, Théâtre de Molière, 2 February 1806.
- La Famille vénitienne, ou le Château d’Orsenno, melodrama in 3 acts, extravaganza, Paris, Théâtre des Jeunes-Artistes, 7 May 1806.
- M. Rikiki, ou le Voyage à Sceaux, vaudeville in 1 act, with Roset, Paris, Théâtre des Jeunes-Artistes, 24 May 1806.
- Le Génie des isles noires, ou Quiribirini, melodrama féerie in 3 acts, extravaganza, Paris, Nouveaux-Troubadours, 10 July 1806.
- La Forêt d’Edimbourg, ou les Écossais, melodrama in 3 acts, Paris, Théâtre de la Gaîté, 6 August 1806.
- La Chaumière du Mont-Jura, ou les Bûcherons suisses, melodrama in 3 acts, in prose and with extravaganza, Paris, Théâtre de la Gaîté, 27 August 1806.
- L’Aveugle du Tyrol, melodrama in 3 acts, extravaganza, Paris, Théâtre de la Gaîté, 16 March 1807.
- Les Petits Troubadours, melodrama in 3 acts, extravaganza, mingled with song, Paris, Théâtre des Nouveaux-Troubadours, 28 July 1807.
- La Queue de lapin, melodrama-arlequinade-féerie-comique in 3 acts, extravaganza, Paris, Théâtre de la Gaîté, 21 November 1807.
- La Famille des jobards, ou les Trois cousins, vaudeville in 1 act, with Eugène Cantiran de Boirie, Paris, Théâtre de la Gaîté, 9 May 1808.
- La Bataille de Pultassa, historical melodrama in 3 acts, with Eugène Cantiran de Boirie, Paris, Théâtre de l’Ambigu-Comique, 1 September 1808.
- La Famille des malins, vaudeville grivois in 1 act, with Nicolas Brazier, Paris, Théâtre de la Gaîté, 15 December 1808.
- L’Homme de la Forêt noire, melodrama in 3 acts, extravaganza, with Eugène Cantiran de Boirie, Paris, Théâtre de la Gaîté, 16 March 1809.
- Les Albinos vivants, folie in 1 act, Paris, Théâtre de la Gaîté, 9 May 1809.
- L’Isle des mariages, ou les Filles en loterie, comical melodrama in 3 acts, extravaganza, with Alexandre Bernos, Paris, Théâtre de la Gaîté, 22 November 1809.
- Le Lion de Florence, ou l’Héroïsme maternel, historical tableaux in two actions, Paris, Théâtre de la Salle des Jeux-Gymniques, 28 February 1810.
- La Tête rouge, ou le Mandrin du Nord, historical tableaux in two actions and extravaganza, with a prologue in prose, Paris, Théâtre de la Salle des Jeux-Gymniques, 15 May 1810.
- Soubakoff, ou la Révolte des Cosaques, scènes pantomimes équestres in 3 parts, extravaganza, Paris, Cirque-Olympique, 9 June 1810.
- La Roche du diable, scènes-féeries dans le genre italien, in 3 parts and extravaganza, Paris, Théâtre des Jeux-Forains, 23 October 1810.
- Le Sabot miraculeux, ou l’Île des nains, scènes-féeries in 3 parts, extravaganza, Paris, Théâtre des Jeux-Forains, 8 January 1811.
- Le Grand Justicier, ou la Conjuration aragonaise, melodrama in 3 acts, Paris, Théâtre de la Gaîté, 12 March 1811.
- Les Cosaques, ou le Fort du Niéper, tableaux in 3 actions, extravaganza, Paris, Théâtre de la Salle des Jeux-Gymniques, 13 May 1811.
- Le Petit Poucet, ou l’Ogre de la montagne de fer, tale by Charles Perrault set in motion, scenes in 3 parts, Paris, Théâtre des Jeux-Forains, 20 July 1811.
- La Fille-tambour, scene in 3 parts, extravaganza, with Pierre-Joseph Charrin, Paris, Théâtre Montansier, 1 October 1811.
- Le Berceau d’Arlequin, jeux florains in 50 scenes, Paris, Théâtre des Jeux-Forains, 10 February 1812.
- Le Maréchal de Luxembourg, melodrama in 3 acts, extravaganza, with Eugène Cantiran de Boirie, Paris, Théâtre de la Gaîté, 26 September 1812.
- Les Bédouins, ou la Tribu du Mont-Liban, pantomime in 3 acts, extravaganza, Paris, Cirque-Olympique, 10 April 1813.
- Le Fils banni, melodrama in 3 acts and extravaganza, Paris, Théâtre de l’Ambigu-Comique, 12 January 1815.
- Le Pic terrible, ou la Pauvre mère, pantomime in 3 acts, Paris, Cirque-Olympique, 26 April 1815.
- Jean-Bart, ou le Voyage en Pologne, melodrama in 3 acts, extravaganza, music by Louis Alexandre Piccinni, Paris, Théâtre de la Porte-Saint-Martin, 5 August 1815.
- La Grotte de Fingal, ou le Soldat mystérieux, extravaganza melodrama, in 3 acts, with Aimé Desprez, music by Alexandre Piccinni, Paris, Théâtre de la Porte Saint-Martin, 30 September 1815.
- La Famille d’Anglade, ou le Vol, melodrama in 3 acts, extravaganza, from causes célèbres, with Fournier, Paris, Théâtre de la Porte Saint-Martin, 11 January 1816.
- La Vallée du torrent, ou l’Orphelin et le meurtrier, melodrama in 3 acts, extravaganza, Paris, Théâtre de la Porte Saint-Martin, 29 May 1816.
- Aureng-Zeb, ou la Famille indienne, melodrama in 3 acts, music by Louis Alexandre Piccinni, Paris, Théâtre de la Porte Saint-Martin, 27 February 1817.
- Daniel, ou la Fosse aux lions, pantomime in dialogue in 3 acts extravaganza, Paris, Théâtre de la Porte Saint-Martin, 9 July 1817.
- La Brouille et le raccommodement, comedy en 1 act, mingled with vaudevilles, Paris, Théâtre de la Porte Saint-Martin, 13 November 1817.
- Le Maréchal de Villars, ou la Bataille de Denain, historical melodrama in 3 acts, extravaganza, with Jean-Jacques Duperche, Paris, Théâtre de la Porte Saint-Martin, 27 November 1817.
- Le Petit Chaperon Rouge, mélodrame-féerie in 3 acts, in prose, with Nicolas Brazier, Paris, Théâtre de la Porte Saint-Martin, 28 February 1818.
- La Cabane de Montainard, ou les Auvergnats, melodrama in 3 acts extravaganza, Victor Ducange, Paris, Théâtre de la Porte Saint-Martin, 26 September 1818.
- Sbogar, comedy in 1 act, mingled with couplets, with Michel-Nicolas Balisson de Rougemont and Eugène Cantiran de Boirie, Paris, Théâtre des Variétés, 26 December 1818.
- Le Garçon d’honneur, imitation de la Fille d’honneur, in 1 act and vaudevilles, Paris, Théâtre de la Porte Saint-Martin, 13 February 1819.
- Lolotte et Fanfan, ou les Flibustiers, pantomime in 3 acts, Paris, 19 March 1819.
- Le Banc de sable, ou les Naufragés français, melodrama in 3 acts, in prose extravaganza, with Eugène Cantiran de Boirie and Jean-Toussaint Merle, Paris, Théâtre de la Porte Saint-Martin, 14 April 1819.
- Le Mineur d’Aubervald, melodrama in 3 acts, in prose extravaganza, with Victor Ducange, Paris, Théâtre de l’Ambigu-Comique, 25 April 1820.
- La Famille Sirven, ou Voltaire à Castres, with Jean-Baptiste Dubois, Paris, Théâtre de la Gaîté, 27 June 1820 Text on line.
- Fanfan la Tulipe, ou En avant ! one-act play, mingled with vaudevilles, with Jean-Baptiste Dubois, Paris, Théâtre de la Gaîté, 1 August 1820.
- M. Duquignon, comedy in 1 act, mingled with couplets, with Benjamin Antier, Paris, Théâtre de la Porte Saint-Martin, 16 January 1821.
- Ismayl et Maryam, ou l’Arabe et la chrétienne, play in 3 acts, extravaganza, with Bon Taylor, Paris, Panorama-Dramatique, 14 April 1821.
- La Sorcière, ou l’Orphelin écossais, melodrama in 3 acts and in prose, from Walter Scott, with Victor Ducange, Paris, Théâtre de la Gaîté, 3 May 1821.
- Anne de Boulen, melodrama in 3 acts, with Michel-Nicolas Balisson de Rougemont, Paris, Théâtre de l’Ambigu-Comique, 8 May 1821.
- Le Bureau des nourrices, foly in 1 act, mingled with couplets, with Gabriel-Alexandre Belle, Paris, Théâtre de la Gaîté, 16 February 1822.
- Paoli, ou les Corses et les Génois, melodrama in 3 acts, extravaganza, with Auguste Le Poitevin de L'Égreville, Paris, Théâtre de la Gaîté, 26 March 1822.
- La Fausse Clef, ou les Deux fils, melodrama in 3 acts, with Jean-Baptiste Pellissier, Paris, Théâtre de la Gaîté, 22 January 1823.
- Barbe-bleue, folie-féerie in 2 acts, preceded by Un coup de baguette, prologue in 1 act, with Nicolas Brazier, Paris, Théâtre de la Gaîté, 24 May 1823.
- Le Mauvais sujet, comedy in 1 act, mingled with couplets, from the novel by Léonide, with Edmond Crosnier, Paris, Théâtre de la Porte Saint-Martin, 4 March 1824.
- Minuit, ou la Révélation, melodrama in 3 acts, extravaganza, with Edmond Crosnier, Paris, Théâtre de la Gaîté, 10 Juna 1824.
- Le Mulâtre et l’Africaine, melodrama in 3 acts, extravaganza, with Jean-Baptiste Pellissier, Paris, Théâtre de la Gaîté, 14 September 1824.
- L’Étrangère, melodrama in 3 acts, from the novel by Charles-Victor Prévot, vicomte d'Arlincourt, with Edmond Crosnier, Paris, Théâtre de la Gaîté, 26 April 1825.
- Sapajou, ou le Naufrage des singes, folie in 2 acts, mingled with pantomime and dance, Paris, Théâtre de la Gaîté, 3 August 1825.
- Le Chemin creux, melodrama in 3 acts, extravaganza, with Auguste Lepoitevin de L'Égreville and Henry Mourier, Paris, Théâtre de la Gaîté, 22 November 1825.
- Le Moulin des étangs, melodrama in 4 acts, with Jean-Baptiste Pellissier, Paris, Théâtre de la Gaîté, 28 January 1826.
- Louise, drama in 3 acts and in prose, with Edmond Crosnier, Paris, Théâtre de l'Odéon, 17 February 1827.

== Sources ==
- Gustave Vapereau, Dictionnaire universel des littératures, Paris, Hachette, 1876, (p. 678).
