= Léopold Chandezon =

French playwright and librettist

Léopold Chandezon (died 17 July 1846) was a French playwright and librettist of the 19th century whose plays have been presented on the most famous Parisian stages of his time: Théâtre de l'Ambigu-Comique, Théâtre de la Gaîté, Théâtre de la Porte-Saint-Martin etc.

== Works ==
- Le Dernier bulletin, ou la Paix, impromptu with vaudevilles, with Darrodes de Lillebonne, 1806
- Baudoin de Jérusalem ou les Héritiers de Palestine, melodrama in three acts, with Eugène Cantiran de Boirie, 1814
- Henri IV, ou la Prise de Paris, historical melodrama in 3 acts, with de Boirie and J-B. Dubois, 1814
- Jean sans peur, duc de Bourgogne, ou le Pont de Montereau, heroic melodrama in 3 acts in prose, with de Boirie, 1815
- Le Mariage de Clovis ou Le Berceau de la Monarchie française, melodrama in 3 acts, à grand spectacle, with de Boirie and J-B. Dubois, 1815
- La Marquise de Gange, ou les Trois frères, historic melodrama in 3 acts in prose, with de Boirie, 1815
- La Sibylle, ou La mort et le médecin, féerie in 2 acts, with songs and dances, with de Boirie and J-B. Dubois, 1815
- Le Connétable Du Guesclin, ou le Château des Pyrénées, melodrama in 3 acts, in prose, with de Boirie, 1816
- Le sacrifice d'Abraham, play in 4 acts, with Cuvelier, 1816
- Les Machabées ou La prise de Jérusalem, sacred drama in 4 acts, with Cuvelier, 1817
- La Fille maudite, melodrama in 3 acts, with de Boirie, 1817
- La Gueule de lion, ou la Mère esclave, melodrama in 3 acts in prose, with Cuvelier, 1817
- Roland furieux, chivalrous pantomime and magic in 4 acts, with prologues, with Cuvelier, 1817
- La Forêt de Sénart, melodrama in 3 acts, with de Boirie, 1818
- Jean Sbogar, melodrama in 3 acts, with Cuvelier, 1818
- Le Coffre de fer, ou la Grotte des Apennins, pantomime in three acts, with Cuvelier, 1818
- La Grand-maman, 1 act comedy, in prose, mixed with vaudevilles, with Jean-Baptiste Dubois, 1819
- La Montre d'or, ou le Retour du fils, mimodrame in 2 acts, with Cuvelier, 1820
- La Muette, ou la Servante de Weilhem, fait historique in 1 act, 1820
- Le Paysan grand seigneur, ou la Pauvre mère, melodrama in 3 acts, with de Boirie, 1820
- Sydonie, ou La famille de Meindorff, with Cuvelier, 1821
- L'armure, ou le Soldat moldave, melodrama in 3 acts, with Cuvelier, 1821
- La Prise de corps, ou la Fortune inattendue, folie anecdotique in 1 acte and in prose, 1821
- La Prise de Milan, ou Dorothée et La Trémouille, play in 3 acts, with Cuvelier, 1821
- Le Temple de la mort, ou Ogier-le-Danois, play in 3 acts, with Cuvelier, 1821
- La chasse ou le jardinier de Muldorff, comédie en vaudevilles, in one acte, with de Boirie, 1823
- Le Remords, melodrama in 3 acts, 1823
- Cardillac ou Le quartier de l'Arsenal, with Béraud, 1824
- Les Aventuriers, ou le Naufrage, melodrama in 3 acts, with Antony Béraud, 1825
- La Corbeille de mariage, ou les Étrennes du futur, vaudeville in 1 act, with Maurice Alhoy and Armand-François Jouslin de La Salle, 1825
- Cagliostro, melodrama in 3 acts, with Béraud, 1825
- Les Prisonniers de guerre, melodrama in 3 acts, with Béraud, 1825
- La Redingotte et la perruque, ou le Testament, mimodrame in 3 actes, with Béraud, 1825
- Mazeppa, ou le Cheval tartare, mimodrame in 3 acts, after lord Byron, with Jean-Guillaume-Antoine Cuvelier, 1825
- Le Corregidor ou les Contrebandiers, melodrama in 3 acts, with Béraud, 1826
- Le Rôdeur, ou les Deux apprentis, drama in 3 acts, with Béraud, 1827
- Le Vétéran, military play in 2 acts, with Béraud, 1827
- Desrues, melodrama in 3 acts, with Jules Dulong and Saint-Amand, 1828
- Irène, ou la Prise de Napoli, melodrama in 2 acts, with Béraud, 1828
- La Muse du boulevard, dream in two periods, with prologue and epilogue, mixed with songs, with Dulong and Saint-Amand, 1828
- L’Éléphant du roi de Siam, play in 3 acts and 9 parts, with Ferdinand Laloue, 1829
- Le Nain de Sunderwald, play in 2 acts and 8 parts, 1829
- La Tour d'Auvergne, premier grenadier de France, military play in 2 periods and 8 parts, 1829
- Le Voile bleu, folie-vaudeville in 1 act, with Michel-Nicolas Balisson de Rougemont and Dulong, 1827
- Ma Rente avant tout, comédie en vaudevilles in 1 act, 1837
