= Hyacinthe Decomberousse =

- Born: Hyacinthe-François-Isaac Decomberousse; 3 July 1786; Vienne (Isère)
- Died: 23 May 1856 (aged 69); Paris
- Occupation: Dramatist

Hyacinthe-François-Isaac Decomberousse (3 July 1786 – 23 May 1856) was a French dramatist. He wrote under the pen name « Montbrun »

== Theatre ==
- Le Lépreux de la vallée d'Aoste, 3-act melodrama with Théodore Baudouin d'Aubigny and Jean-Toussaint Merle, théâtre de la Porte-Saint-Martin, 13 August 1822;
- Jane Shore, 3 acts melodrama with Armand-François Jouslin de La Salle, Alphonse de Chavanges, théâtre de la Porte Saint-Martin, (1824)
- Le Docteur d'Altona, 3-act melodrama with Alphonse de Chavanges and Auguste Maillard, théâtre de la Porte Saint-Martin, (18 October 1825).
