= Charles de Longchamps =

French playwright (1768–1832)

- Born: Charles Charpentier de Longchamps; 1768; Mauritius
- Died: 17 April 1832 (aged 63–64); Louviers, France
- Occupation: Playwright

Charles Charpentier de Longchamps (1768 – 17 April 1832) was a French playwright.

A Secretary to the Grand Duchess of Berg, Naples Theatres Superintendent under the reign of Joachim Murat, a lyricist for François-Adrien Boieldieu for his Quinzième recueil de quatre nouvelles romances avec accompagnement de piano-forte and for his Recueil de six nouvelles romances avec accompagnement de harpe par M.de Cléry, his plays were presented on the most important Parisian stages of the 19th century: Théâtre du Vaudeville, Théâtre de l'Opéra-Comique, Théâtre-Français, etc.

== Works ==
- 1797: Ma Tante Aurore, ou le roman impromptu, comedy in 2 acts, mixed with ariettes, music by François-Adrien Boieldieu,
- 1799: L'Heureuse nouvelle, opera impromptu à l'occasion de la paix
- 1799: L'Arbitre, ou les Consultations de l'an sept, comedy in 1 act in prose mixed with vaudevilles
- 1799: Comment faire ? ou Les épreuves de misanthropie et repentir, comedy in one act, with Michel Dieulafoy and Étienne de Jouy
- 1799: La Prisonnière, opera in 1 act and in prose, mixed with ariettes, with Claude Godard d'Aucourt de Saint-Just, music by Boieldieu and Luigi Cherubini
- 1799: Le Vaudeville au Caire, comédie-folie in 1 act and in vaudevilles
- 1799: Emma ou La prisonnière, opéra comique, music by Boieldieu and Cherubini
- 1800: Le Tableau des Sabines, vaudeville in 1 act, with Dieulafoy and de Jouy
- 1803: Le Séducteur amoureux, comedy in 3 acts, in verses
- 1806: L'Ivrogne corrigé, comedy in 2 acts and in prose, with Dieulafoy
- 1819: A-t-il perdu ?, comedy in 1 act and in prose
- 1821: Poésies fugitives
- 1825: Dans quel Siècle sommes-nous ?, comedy in 1 act, mixed with vaudevilles, with Dieulafoy and de Jouy
- 1826: L'Égoïste par régime, comédie en vaudevilles in 1 act, with Ferdinand Laloue

== Bibliography ==
- Joseph-Marie Quérard, La France littéraire, 1833, (p. 346)
- Ludovic Lalanne, Dictionnaire historique de la France, 1872, (p. 1157)
- Georges Favre, Boieldieu : sa vie, son œuvre, 1944, (p. 9)
