= Édouard Magnien =

Marie Édouard Magnien ( 4 July 1795 – 7 March 1866) was a 19th-century French intellectual.

== Biography ==
Magnien was born in Montfort-l'Amaury, the son of Jacques Magnien, a lawyer in Parliament, and Justine Anastasie Vallon. He is Stéphane Mallarmé's great-great-cousin. A tutor in the Sarthe department, he is mostly known for his Pétition à la Chambre des Députés, sur la conservation des monuments français in 1826 and his participation in the writing of the play Le Secret d'état (1831) by Eugène Sue and Ferdinand de Villeneuve.

A founding member of the Société des Sciences naturelle, he resigned in 1864.

He died in Paris.

== Works ==
- 1821: L'Ode au sommeil, ode
- 1826: Pétition à la Chambre des Députés, sur la conservation des monuments français
- 1831: Le Secret d'état, comédie en vaudevilles in 1 act, with Eugène Sue and Ferdinand de Villeneuve
- 1836: Mortel, ange ou démon, 2 vols., collection of poems
- 1836: Excursions en Espagne ou chroniques provinciales de la péninsule
- 1841: Épître à un centenaire, 1841
- 1851: Notice nécrologique sur M. Adolphe Veytard

== Bibliography ==
- Revue de l'Histoire de Versailles et de Seine-et-Oise, 1968, p. 27
