= Frédéric Thomas (playwright) =

French politician (1814–1884)

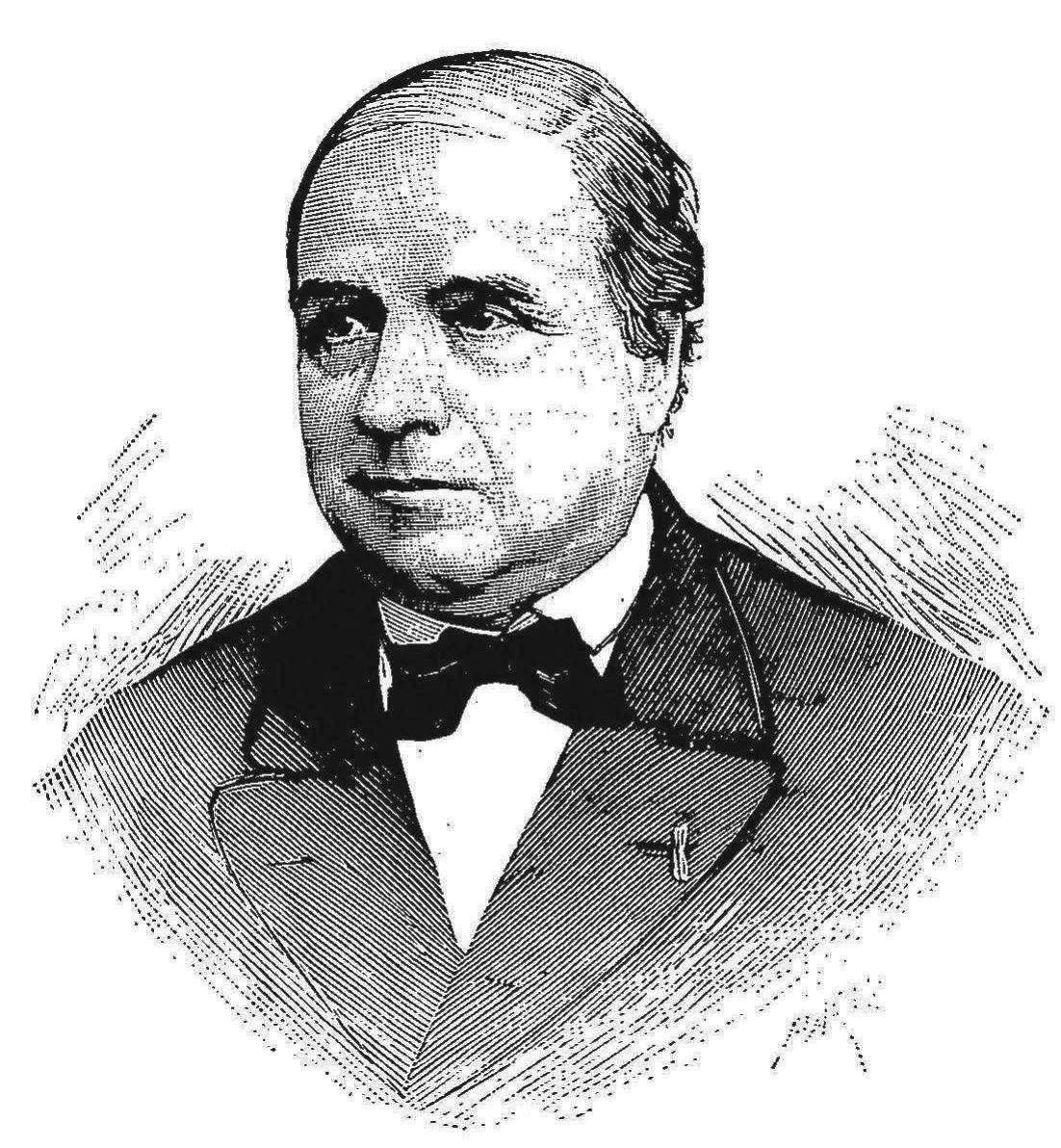
Thomas, Frédéric (Univers illustré, 1884-02-09)

Frédéric Thomas (5 January 1814 in Castres (Tarn) – 27 January 1884 in Paris) was a 19th-century French politician and playwright.

== Short biography ==
A lawyer in 1836, he was especially interested in literature. Winner of the Académie des jeux floraux, he collaborated with the Revue du Midi as well as political newspapers. A critic of the July Monarchy, he found himself in criminal court for press offenses. He moved to Paris in 1840, where he wrote in various newspapers. He was president of the société des gens de lettres from 1868 to 1870. On 6 September 1870 he was appointed prefect of the Tarn department, then general counsel of Castres in 1871. He was appointed counselor of the prefecture of Paris in 1880. From 1881 to 1884, he was MP of Tarn sitting with the left supporting opportunistic governments.

== Works ==
- 1842: La Chaîne électrique, two-act comedy, mingled with song, Théâtre des Variétés, with J. Gabriel
- 1855–1857: Petites causes célèbres
- 1878: La Jeune régente, with Michel Masson
- 1884: Le Maître maçon et le banquier, three-act drame-vaudeville, Théâtre des Folies-Dramatiques, with Michel Masson and Bourdereau
- 1845: Le Télégraphe d'amour, three-act comédie en vaudeville, Théâtre des Folies-Dramatiques, with Michel Masson
- 1846: Jean-Baptiste ou, Un Cœur d'or, five-act drama, mingled with songs, Théâtre de la Gaîté, with Ferdinand de Villeneuve and Michel Masson
- 1846: Un Conte bleu, one-act comédie en vaudeville, Théâtre du Vaudeville, with Lafitte
- 1846: La Fée du bord de l'eau, three-act comédie en vaudeville, Théâtre des Folies-Dramatiques, with Michel Masson

== Sources ==
- "Frédéric Thomas (playwright)", in Adolphe Robert and Gaston Cougny, Dictionnaire des parlementaires français (1789–1891), Bourloton, Paris, 1889 Edition details Wikisource
- "Frédéric Thomas (homme politique, 1814-1884)", dans le Dictionnaire des parlementaires français (1889-1940), sous la direction de Jean Jolly, PUF, 1960
