= Martial Aubertin =

French actor and dramatist

- Born: 18 October 1775; Paris, France
- Died: 15 November 1824 (aged 49); Paris, France
- Occupations: Actor, dramatist

Martial Aubertin (18 October 1775 – 15 November 1824), was a French stage actor and dramatist.

An actor of the Théâtre de la Porte Saint-Martin, Aubertin was generally felt by its qualities and good behavior. Aside from performing theater plays, he produced songs and a few Latin verse pieces.

Theatre:

- La Dupe de la ruse, with Henrion, comédie-vaudeville, Paris, 1808, in-8°;
- Les Deux Veuves ou les Contrastes, comedy in 1 act, with Armand-François Jouslin de La Salle, 10 April 1821;
- Zoé ou l’effet au porteur, in 1 act, with Théophile Dumersan, 1821, in-8°;
- Les Suites d’un bienfait, with Ménessier and Martin, 1821, in-8°, etc.
