= Jacques-Germain Chaudes-Aigues =

French journalist and writer (1814–1847)

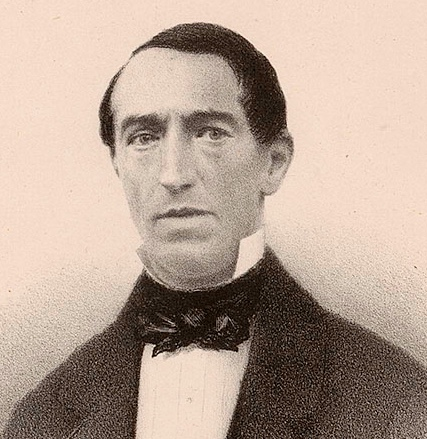
Jacques-Germain Chaudes-Aigues en 1846

Jacques-Germain Chaudes-Aigues (7 February 1814 – 26 January 1847) was a French journalist and writer.

== Biography ==
Born in Santhià (Piémont), Chaudes-Aigues studied in Turin then Grenoble and arrived in Paris in 1832. He then entered the Chronique de Paris directed by Honoré de Balzac and Gustave Planche. A literary, dramatic and musical critic, he collaborated in numerous newspapers such as L’Artiste, the Revue de Paris, La Presse, Le Siècle, La Revue du XIXe siècle, Les Français peints par eux-mêmes, La Galerie des Artistes dramatiques, L’Époque and Le Courrier français.

In 1838, he covered in London, the coronation of Victoria as new Queen of the United Kingdom for L'Artiste.

One of Balzac's detractors, he left an important correspondence with personalities of the 19th century such as Sainte-Beuve, François Buloz, Alexandre Dumas, and Charles Baudelaire.

He died in Paris on 26 January 1847.

== Works ==
- 1834: Élisa de Rialto, U. Canel
- 1835: Le bord de la coupe, at Werdet
- 1836: Sous le froc. Le Chartreux, with Maurice Alhoy, Werdet
- 1841: Les écrivains modernes de la France, Charles Gosselin
- 1841: Alfred de Musset

== Bibliography ==
- Charles Louandre, Félix Bourquelot, La littérature française contemporaine: XIXe siècle, 1846, (p. 604) (Read online)
- Ludovic Lalanne, Dictionnaire historique de la France, 1872, (p. 514)
- Maurice Regard, L'Adversaire des romantiques: Gustave Planche 1808-1857. 1956, (p. 205)
