= Armand-François Jouslin de La Salle =

French lawyer, playwright and theatre director (1794–1863)

- Born: 15 September 1794; Vierzon, France
- Died: 1 July 1863 (aged 68); Paris, France
- Occupations: Lawyer, journalist, theatre director, dramatist

Armand-François Jouslin de La Salle (15 September 1794 – 1 July 1863) was a French lawyer, journalist, dramatist and theatre director. Jouslin de La Salle was administrator of the Comédie-Française from 1832 to 1837, and then of the théâtre des Variétés in 1839.

== Theatre ==
- Le Mûrier, vaudeville in 1 act, with Jules Vernet 22 June 1819.
- Les Deux Veuves ou les Contrastes, comedy in 1 act, with Martial Aubertin, 10 April 1821.
- Jane Shore, melodrame en 3 acts, with Hyacinthe Decomberousse, Alphonse de Chavanges, 1824.
- La Famille du charlatan, folie vaudeville in 1 act, with Maurice de Chavanges, 12 October 1824.
- L’École du scandale, play in 3 acts and in prose, with Charles-R.-E. de Saint-Maurice, Edmond Crosnier, 8 December 1824.
- Les Acteurs à l’auberge, comedy in one act, with Maurice Alhoy and Francis Cornu, 28 May 1825.
- La Corbeille de mariage ou les Étrennes du futur, vaudeville in one act, with Maurice Alhoy and Léopold Chandezon, 31 December 1825.
- Monsieur de Pourceaugnac, ballet-folie-pantomime in 2 acts, with Jean Coralli, 28 janvier 1826.
- Le Tambour et la musette, tableau-vaudeville in one act, with Maurice Alhoy and Charles Nodier, 15 April 1826.
- Gulliver, ballet-folie en 2 actes, with Jean Coralli, 9 May 1826.
- Monsieur de Pourceaugnac, ballet-folie-pantomime in 2 acts, with Jean Coralli, théâtre de la Porte-Saint-Martin, 28 January 1826.
- Gulliver, ballet-folie in 2 acts, with Jean Coralli, théâtre de la Porte-Saint-Martin, 9 May 1826.
- Les Filets de Vulcain ou le Lendemain d’un succès, folie vaudeville in i act, with Dupin, théâtre de la Porte-Saint-Martin, 15 July 1826.
- La Fête du village, or le Cadran de la commune, vaudeville in 1 act for the king's anniversary, with Edmond Crosnier and Baron de Mongenet, 4 November 1826.
- Le Contumace, melodrama in 3 acts, with Charles-R.-E. de Saint-Maurice and Edmond Crosnier, 28 November 1826.
- Le Caissier, drama in 3 acts, with Charles-R.-E. de Saint-Maurice, 30 March 1828.
