= Charles-Gaspard Delestre-Poirson =

French playwright and theatre director

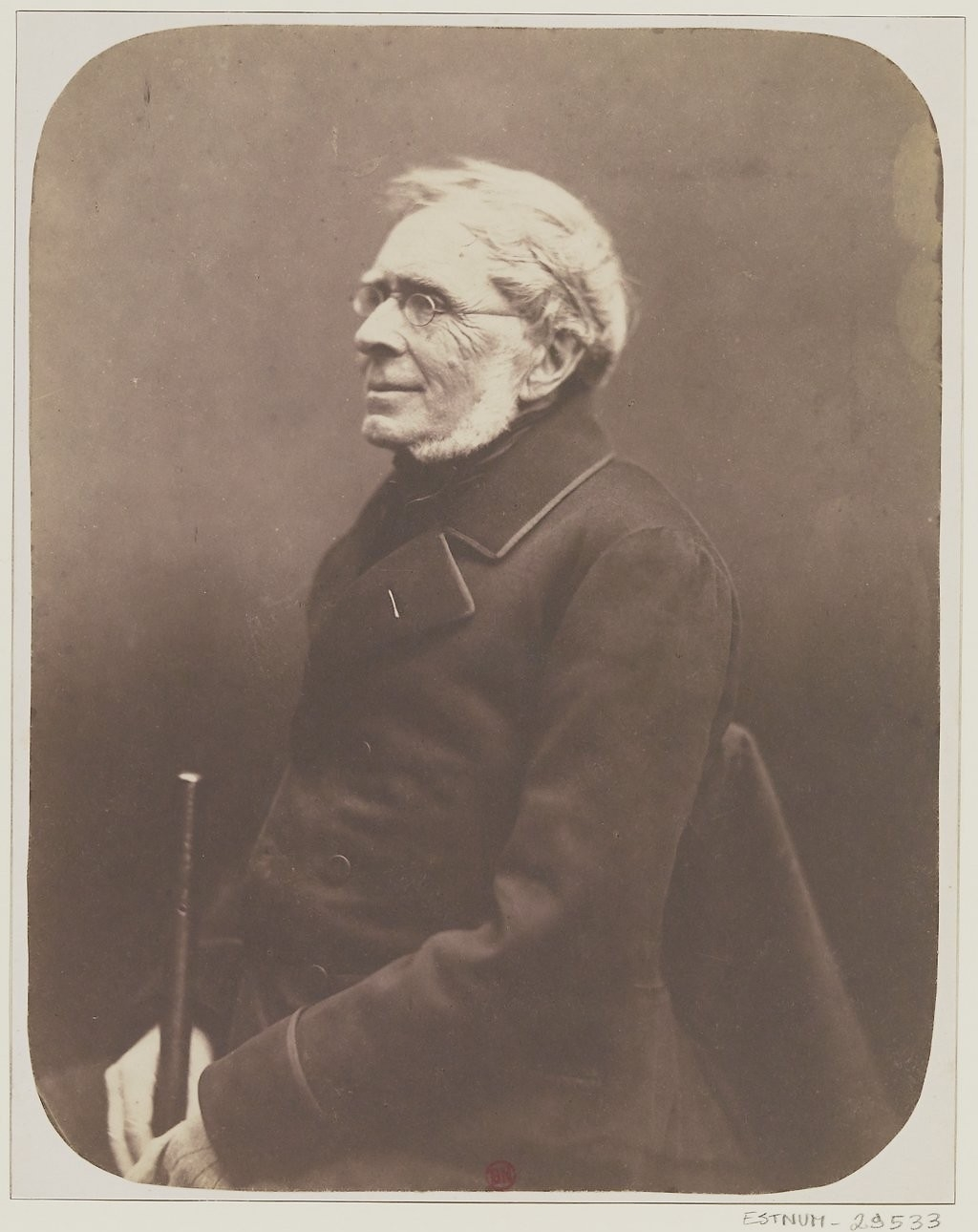
Charles-Gaspard Delestre-Poirson

Charles-Gaspard Delestre-Poirson, known as Delestre-Poirson (22 August 1790, in Paris – 19 November 1859) was a French playwright and theatre director.

== Career ==
Delestre-Poirson was the director of the Gymnase dramatique, from 1820 to 1844; his resistance to the decisions taken by the Société des auteurs dramatiques provoked part of the SACD to boycott using that theatre for 2 years. This conflict, in which only Narcisse Fournier remained loyal to Delestre-Poirson, led in the end to Delestre-Poirson's retirement.

Delestre-Poirson is to be credited with the discovery of all the parts Rachel could play thanks to her deep and penetrating voice, her noble bearing and heroic fits of anger, thus bringing about a renaissance in French classical tragedy, which had been in decline and which Delestre-Poirson thus rejuvenated.

He wrote several comedies, alone (e.g. Le Fat en province ou Le plan de comédie, a 3-act comedy; Inès et Pédrille ou La cousine supposée, a 3-act comedy; Spectacle demandé ou Rien qu'en famille, a one-act divertissement "mêlée de couplets"; Les Anglais supposés ou Lequel est mon gendre?, at Théâtre de la Porte Saint-Martin, 1815), or in collaboration with Eugène Scribe and Mélesville (such as La Petite Pinson ou Une nuit à Beaune, a one-act folie-vaudeville, with Mélesville, put on at the Théâtre des Variétés from 20 February 1819). He also wrote a novel, Un Ladre, récit d’un vieux professeur émérite (Paris, Lenormant, 1859), a touching and moral book whose excellent intentions excuse its implausibility.

== Sources ==
- Gustave Vapereau, L’Année littéraire et dramatique, Paris, Hachette, 1860, p. 458
