= Louis Alexandre Piccinni =

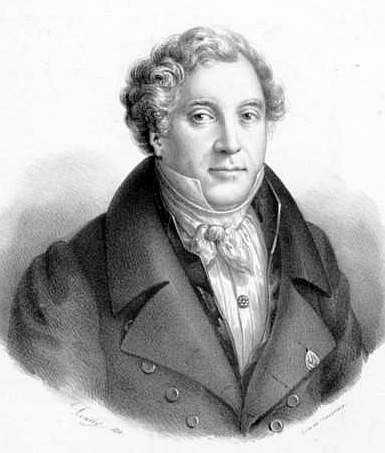
Alexandre Piccinni

Louis Alexandre Piccinni (variously Louis Alexandre, Luigi Alessandro or Lodovice Alessandro) (10 September 1779 – 24 April 1850) was a prolific music composer born in Paris of Italian ancestry.

Alexandre Piccinni was born in Paris. The grandson of the Italian composer of symphonies, sacred music, chamber music, and opera, Niccolò Piccinni, and the son of Giuseppe Luigi Piccinni, Louis was already giving piano lessons at age 13. He studied piano, and later attended the Conservatoire where he studied composition from Jean-François Le Sueur.

He was accompanist at the Théâtre Feydeau, and from 1802 at the Opéra-Comique. From 1803 to 1816, he was conductor of the Théâtre de la Porte Saint-Martin, and from 1804 to 1818 accompanist in the chapels of Louis XVIII at the court.

Piccinni taught singing and piano at Paris until 1836, when he moved to Boulogne to teach and direct at the National Conservatory in Toulouse. He later moved to Strasburg and directed the Baden-Baden concerts. He returned to Paris in 1849 and died there the following year.

Piccinni wrote over 200 works for the stage, including 25 comic operas. His genres also included melodrama; ballet; vaudeville airs; cantatas; romances; sonatas; piano-music; and opera.
