= Paul Duport =

French dramatist & librettiste (1798–1866)

Nicolas-Paul Duport (22 April 1798 – 26 December 1866) was a French dramatist and librettiste who also wrote under the pen names M. P. D., Paulin and Erbert.

== Theatre ==
- 1824 : Le Beau-frère, ou la Veuve à 2 maris, comédie-vaudeville in 1 act, with Auguste Duport and Amable de Saint-Hilaire
- 1824 : Une journée de Charles V, comedy in 1 act in prose, with A. Duport
- 1825 : Kettly ou le Retour en Suisse vaudeville in 1 act by Duvert and Paulin, Vaudeville (28 January)
- 1827 : L'Arbitre, ou les Séductions, comédie-vaudeville in two acts by Théaulon and Paulin, Théâtre de Madame (7 May)
- 1835 : Alda, one-act opera-comique by Bayard and Paul Duport, music by Alphonse Thys, Opéra-Comique, salle des Nouveautés (8 July)
- 1837 : La Champmeslé, comédie anecdotique in two acts mixed with songs by Erbert and Ancelot, vaudeville (11 February)
- 1838 : Le Perruquier de la Régence, opera in three acts by Eugène de Planard and Paul Duport, music by Ambroise Thomas, opera-comique (30 March)

=== Texts ===
- Épître à tout le monde sur l'esprit de parti by M. P. D., 1818

== Bibliography ==
- Gustave Vapereau, « Paul Duport », Dictionnaire universel des contemporains, Hachette, Paris 1870, (p. 600), at Gallica
