= Alexandre Martin =

French politician (1815–1895)

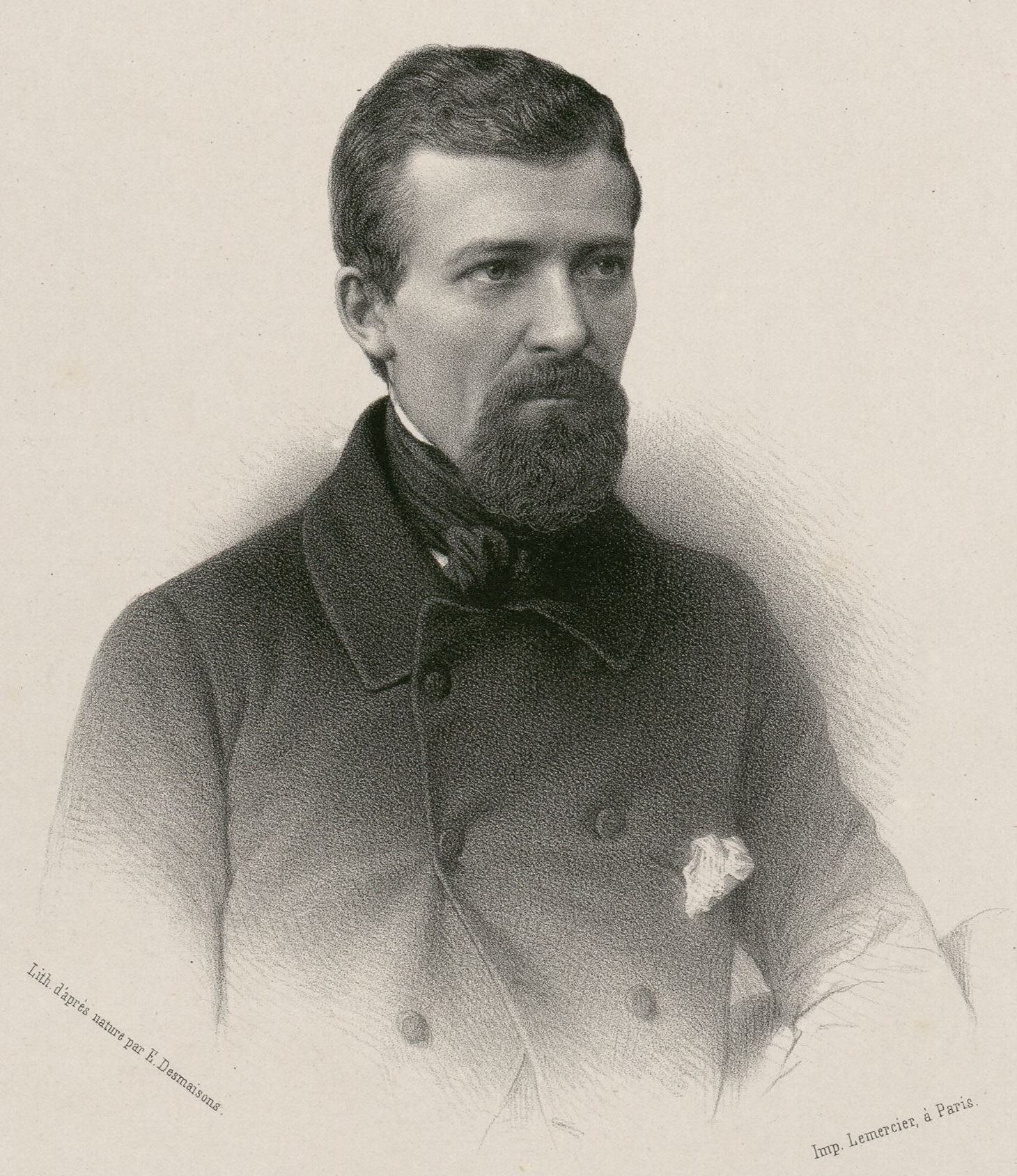
Alexandre Martin, drawn in 1848.

Alexandre Martin (27 April 1815 – 28 May 1895), nicknamed Albert l'Ouvrier ("Albert the Worker"), was a French socialist statesman of the French Second Republic. He was the first member of the industrial working class to be in French government.

== Early life ==
Albert was born in Bury, in the Oise département to a peasant family. As a young man he moved to Paris, where he served as an apprentice in his uncle's machine shop; later, he worked as a machinist in a button factory.

He participated in the July Revolution of 1830. Throughout his public life, he was known simply as "Albert the Worker," and was closely associated with the socialist Louis Blanc. He was a member of a variety of secret revolutionary societies in the 1830s and 1840s. He was made leader of the revolutionary Nouvelles Saisons society in 1839, and editor of the l'Atelier the following year.

== Revolution of 1848 ==
Martin fought on the barricades in the revolution of 1848, and was a member of the socialist government that formed at the Hôtel de Ville. When the socialists were included into the provisional government, Louis Blanc made Albert – by this time a popular figure among the workers – a secretary. He was sent to the Luxembourg Commission – the provisional government's labor commission – as Louis Blanc's vice-president, a position he held until the 15 May riots.

Albert and Blanc were two of the six members of the Luxembourg Commission to be elected in the April elections. The socialists – who, through the Luxembourg Commission ran a virtual state-within-a-state – clashed with the Assembly. Blanc's proposal for a fully fledged ministry of labor in keeping with his ideal for "national workshops" was rejected on 10 May. By this time, Albert had lost faith in the provisional government, and, together with Louis Auguste Blanqui and Armand Barbès, attempted an insurrection of his own. On 15 May, they led a crowd, demonstrating against the government; the riot was bloodily suppressed by the bourgeois National Guards, and Albert and Barbès were captured at the Hôtel de Ville.

== Trial and imprisonment ==
Albert did not defend himself at the subsequent trial at Bourges, in 1849. He was thus found guilty of treason and an attempt to incite revolution, and sent to prison on Belle Île for four years. When he became ill in 1854, he was transferred to Tours, where he remained until he was released by the general amnesty of 16 August 1859.

== Later life ==
Martin returned to Paris as a working man, taking a job for the gas company. In 1870, during the Franco-Prussian War, became a member of the Commission des Barricades in the Government of National Defense, and stood for election twice in the Third Republic, losing both bids. He retired to Mello in his home département of Oise. A national funeral followed his death in 1895 and his tombstone was donated by the government.

== See also ==
- French demonstration of 15 May 1848
