= Louis Gustave Vapereau =

French writer and lexicographer (1819–1906)

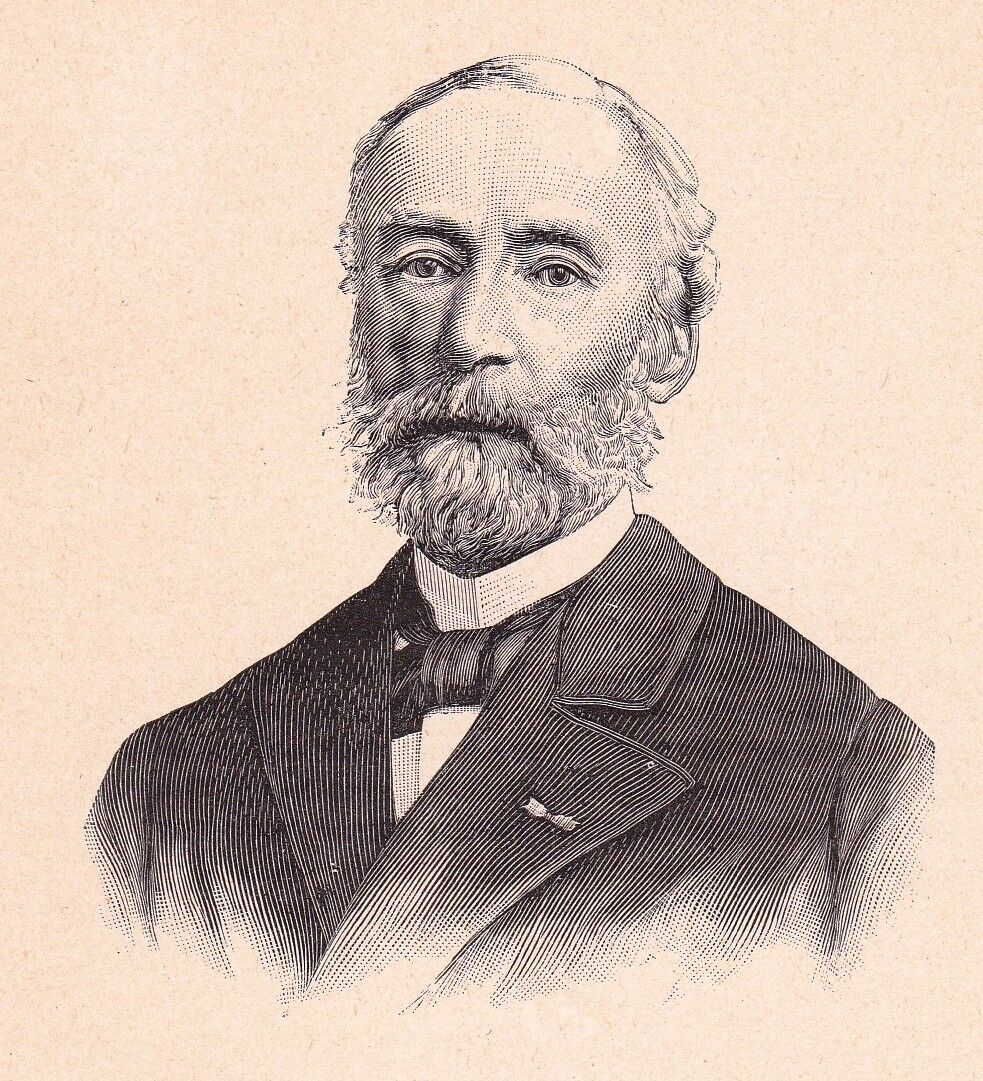
Louis Gustave Vapereau

Louis Gustave Vapereau (4 April 1819 – 18 April 1906) was a French writer and lexicographer famous primarily for his dictionaries, the Dictionnaire universel des contemporains and the Dictionnaire universel des littérateurs.

== Biography ==
Born in Orléans, Louis Gustave Vapereau studied philosophy at the École Normale Supérieure from 1838 to 1843, writing his thesis on Pascal's Pensées under the supervision of Victor Cousin. He taught philosophy at Tours until the establishment of the Second French Empire in 1852, when his republican principles cost him his position.

Vapereau returned to Paris to study law, and in 1854 joined the French bar. He did not engage in any legal practice and returned to writing shortly afterwards. In 1858, he published the Dictionnaire universel des contemporains and from 1859 to 1869 he edited the L'Année littéraire et dramatique.

After the collapse of the Empire, Vapereau was appointed prefect of Cantal on 14 September 1870 by Jules Trochu's Government of National Defense. He then became prefect of Tarn-et-Garonne from 26 March 1871 until 15 February 1873, when, under pressure from the Catholic church, he was released from the prefecture. He also assembled the Dictionnaire universel des littérateurs, publishing it in 1876. From January 1877 to 1888 he was named inspector-general of public elementary schools.

Vapereau was the author of some excellent editions of the classics, and of works on political and social questions, but he is famous for his two dictionaries. He also contributed to a number of journals, including Revue de l'instruction publique, Revue française, Le Petit Journal and L'Illustration. At the time of his death at Morsang-sur-Orge (Essonne) in 1906, he had been a regular contributor to L'Illustration for twenty-six years, with some of his notes written for the journal being collected and published in 1896 as L'Homme et la vie.
