= Maurice Alhoy =

French writer and playwright (1802–1856)

Philadelphe-Maurice Alhoy
- Born: 1802; Paris, France
- Died: April 27, 1856 (aged 53–54); Paris, France
- Occupations: Journalist, writer, playwright
- Writing career
- Language: French
- Notable work: Co-creator of Le Figaro; Les bagnes; Les brigands et bandits célèbres; Les prisons de Paris; La Foire aux idées; Les Cent et un Robert Macaire; Le Musée pour rire

Philadelphe-Maurice Alhoy (1802 – 27 April 1856) was a 19th-century French journalist, writer and playwright, born and died in Paris.

== As journalist ==
Under the Restauration and the July Monarchy, when "every day saw the birth of a new paper" (Eugène de Mirecourt), Maurice Alhoy founded Le Philanthrope (1825), "newspaper devoted to charity, morality and the public good.", Le Dandy, Le Pauvre Jacques (1829), the Journal des familles, the Gazette des enfants, the Moniteur des gourmands, L’Ours (1834), a newspaper written "by a company of beasts with beaks and nails". He was involved in the writing of several other journals, including a journal-vaudeville, La Foire aux idées (1849). But he will remain above all as the creator, with Étienne Arago, of Le Figaro on 14 janvier 1826. The beginnings were difficult; the newspaper was sold two months later to Auguste Le Poitevin de L'Égreville, then to Victor Bohain who took over the responsibility.

In this vein of journalism, a series of books can be linked to both historical narrative and journalistic investigation, covering the living conditions of marginalized populations: Les bagnes : Rochefort (1830), Les bagnes : histoires, types, mœurs, mystères (1845), Les brigands et bandits célèbres (1845), Les prisons de Paris (with Louis Lurine, 1846). Two years later, under his leadership, a Biographie parlementaire des représentants du peuple à l'Assemblée nationale constituante de 1848, written by a "society of publicists and men of letters" was published, where we meet his friends Étienne Arago and Louis Lurine. Along with other writers and publicists, he participated in collections of collective texts, including Paris révolutionnaire, foyer de lumières et d'insurrection (6 vol., 1833–1834), Nouveau tableau de Paris au XIXe (1834–1835) as well as Paris historique, pittoresque et anecdotique (Le Luxembourg, vol.7, 1855).

== As dramatist ==
He created for the stage many plays (more than forty) in the taste of the time: comédies en vaudeville, dramas, melodramas, reviews and variety scenes, written almost always in collaboration and signed by his first names (Philadelphe or Philadelphe-Maurice) or under various pseudonymes (Depontchartrain or de Pontchartrain, Saint-Gervais or "the[H]ermit of Luxembourg"). Some titles from the repertoire will give an idea of it: L'agent de change ou Une fin de mois, 3-act drama imitated from Beaumarchais (1825), La Vogue, big show vaudeville (1825), Bergami et la reine d'Angleterre, drama in 5 acts (1833), Le Magasin pittoresque (1834), a review in 15 deliveries. Some of these texts can be found in Le Magasin théâtral, choix de pièces nouvelles jouées sur tous les théâtres de Paris de 1834 à 1839 (25 bands in 13 volumes, see on Gallica).

His knowledge of the world of the stage and its protagonists is reflected very early on in the publication of the Dictionnaire théâtral (according to the subtitle "twelve hundred and thirty-three truths about the directors, directors, actors, actresses and employees of the various theatres."), written in collaboration with Charles Jean Harel and Auguste Jal 1st ed. 1824, see on Gallica); One year later, he published the Grande biographie dramatique, ou Silhouette des acteurs, actrices, chanteurs, cantatrices, danseurs, danseuses... (1825) which he signed under his pseudonym L'Ermite du Luxembourg. The article "Variétés" of the Dictionnaire théâtral à propos aptly puts the interest of this form of entertainment: "The most advantageous situation, a charming room and a rare collection of varied talents may have done even less for the prosperity of this theatre than the license and tone of the works whose repertoire is uniformly composed".

== Other publications ==
In parallel to his theatrical activity, he wrote in a comic or humorous register that does not take us far from the scene of the accompanying texts for illustrated albums: Les Cent et un Robert Macaire (with Louis Huart, drawings by Daumier, 1839) and Le Musée pour rire, dessins par tous les caricaturistes de Paris (with Louis Huart and Charles Philipon, 1839–1840). He is also the author of several "Physiologies", then very much in vogue: that of the traveller (ill. by Daumier and Ange-Louis Janet-Lange, 1841), the lorette (whores) (ill. by Gavarni, 1841), the longshoreman (ill. by Gavarni, 1842), the creditor and debtor (ill. by Janet-Lange, 1842).

We also owe him Les Fleurs historiques (with Jules Rostaing, 1852) and Les Mémoires de Bilboquet, recueillis par un bourgeois de Paris (with Taxile Delord and Edmond Texier, 1854). In 1836, with Jacques-Germain Chaudes-Aigues (under the pseudonym "Jacques de Chaudesaigues"), he had a novel entitled Sous le froc, le chartreux published, inspired by a stay of several months at the La Trappe Abbey monastery.

== Quote ==
Many statesmen who talk about prison in the gallery, many publicists who paint these exceptional places in long columns, many innovators who expect abuses to benefit utopias, have not seen prison better than I did the day when, to get out of my habit, I wanted to visit it with a planton.

(Les bagnes: histoires, types, mœurs, mystères, Paris, Ed. Havard, 1845, (p. 239).

== Bibliography ==
- Joseph-Marie Quérard, La littérature française contemporaine [...] : le XIXe, Paris, Daguin frères, 1842–1857.
- Edmond Werdet, Souvenirs de la vie littéraire. Portraits intimes : Maurice Alhoy [...], Paris, E. Dentu éditeur, 1879.
- M. Prevost, Roman d'Amat, H. Tribout de Morembert (dir.), Dictionnaire de biographie française, Paris, Letouzey and Ané, 1982–1985.
- Marie-Ève Thérenthy, Mosaïques, être écrivain entre presse et roman, 1829–1836, Paris, Champion, 2003.
