= Théâtre de la Porte Saint-Martin =

Parisian theatre and opera house

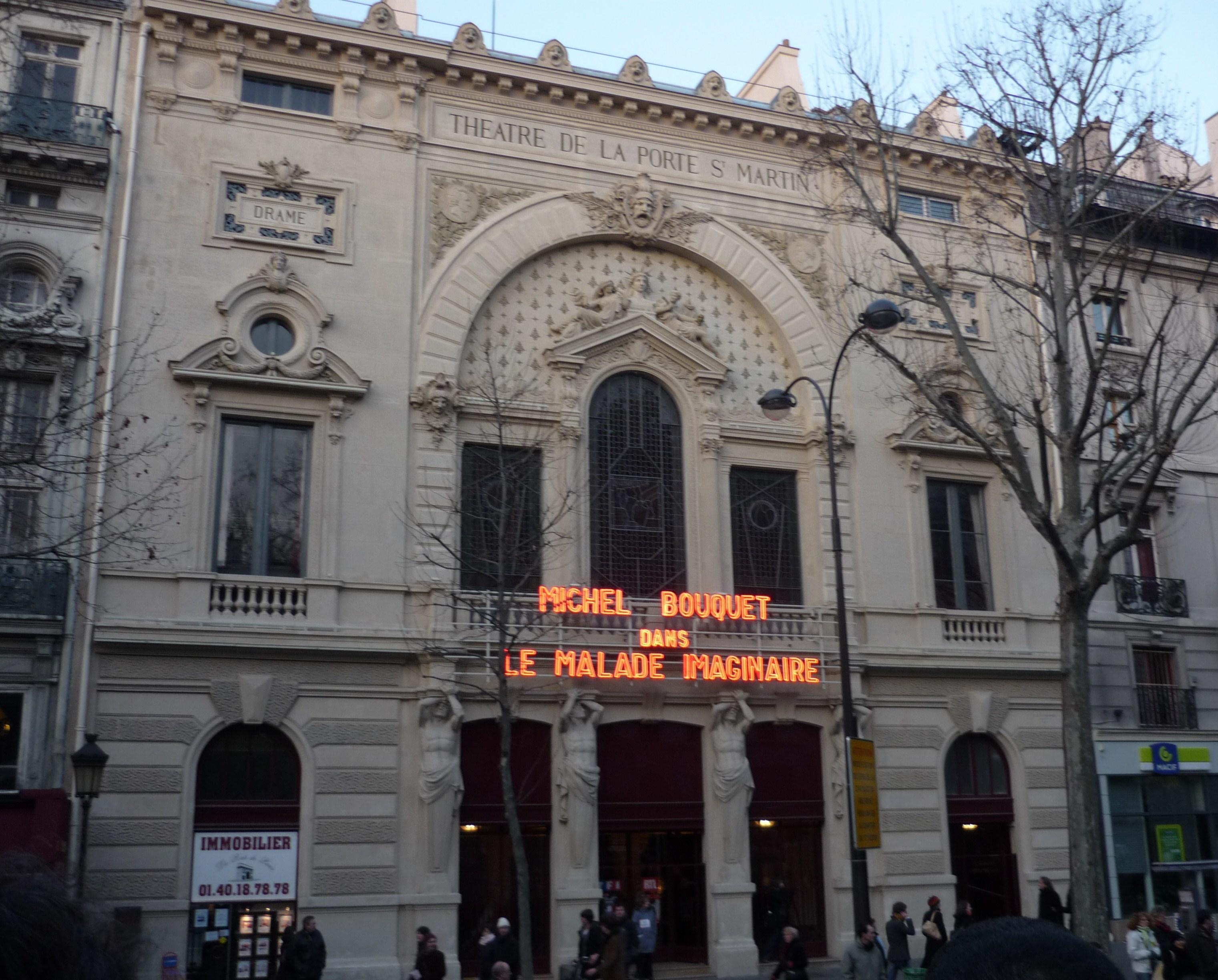
- The Théâtre de la Porte Saint-Martin in 2009
- Interactive map of Théâtre de la Porte Saint-Martin
- Address: 18 Boulevard Saint-Martin
- Location: Paris, France
- Coordinates: 48°52′8.5″N 2°21′24″E
- Type: Theatre

Construction
- Opened: 1781
- Renovated: 1873
- Architect: Oscar de la Chardonnière

Website
- www.portestmartin.com

The Théâtre de la Porte Saint-Martin (French pronunciation: [teɑtʁ də la pɔʁt sɛ̃ maʁtɛ̃]) is a venerable theatre and opera house at 18, Boulevard Saint-Martin in the 10th arrondissement of Paris.

== History ==
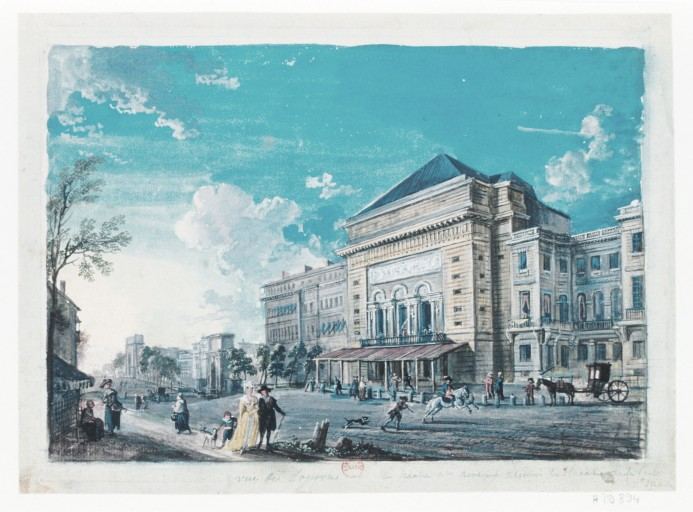
The Théâtre de la Porte Saint-Martin c.1790

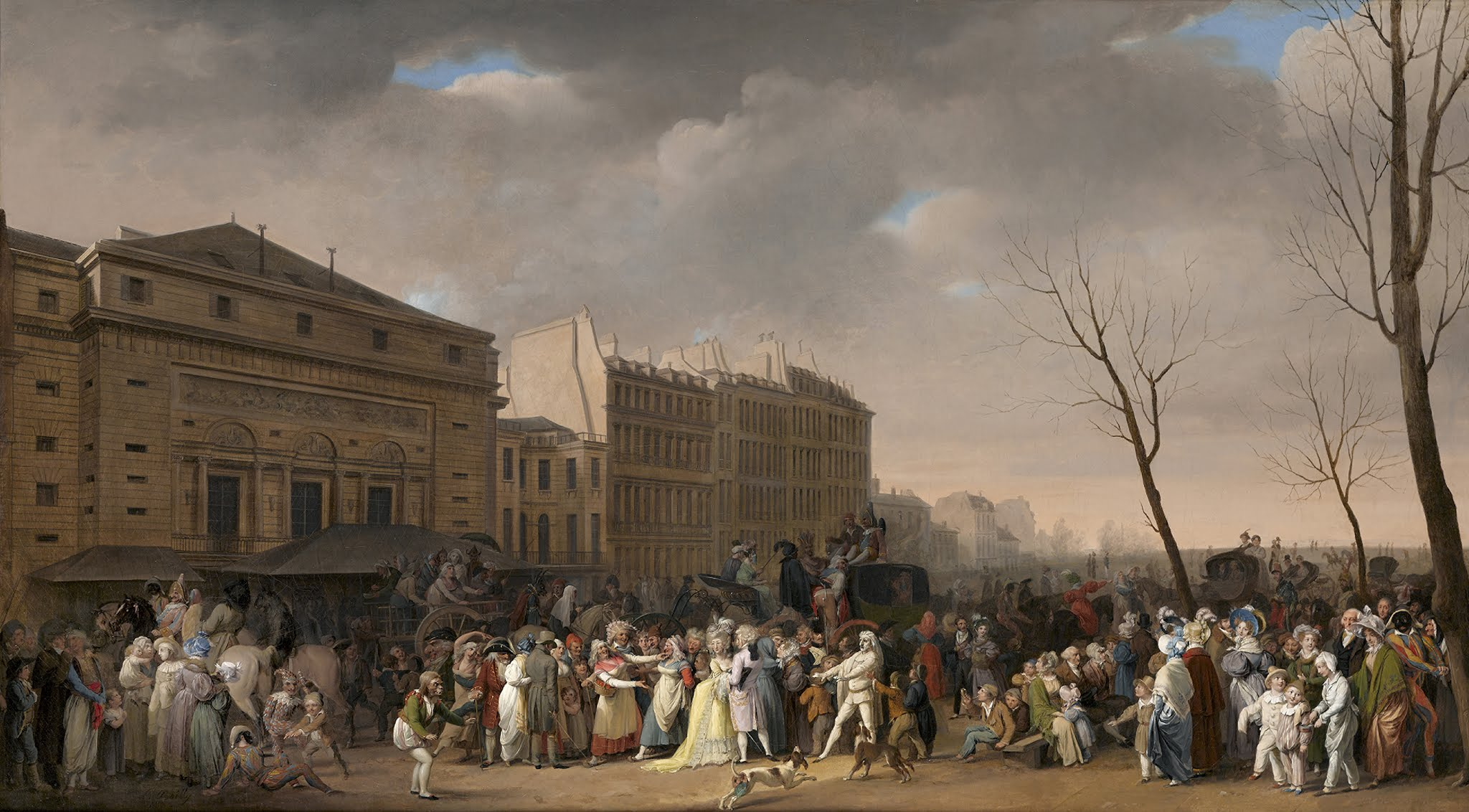
A Carnival Scene by Louis-Léopold Boilly, 1832. The theatre is in the background.

It was first built very rapidly in 1781 under the direction of Nicolas Lenoir (1726–1810) to house the Paris Opéra, whose previous home, the second Salle du Palais-Royal, had burned down on 8 June 1781. The new theatre had a capacity of about 2,000 spectators and included a parterre with the lowest-priced tickets sold only to males who stood throughout the performances, an amphitheatre, and four rows of boxes. The Opéra used the theatre from 27 October 1781 until August 1794.

The theatre was destroyed by fire during the Paris Commune of 1871 and replaced in 1873 with a building designed by the architect Oscar de la Chardonnière (d. 1881), who enlisted the aid of the sculptor Jacques-Hyacinthe Chevalier (1825–1895) in the design of the new facade. The new interior was designed by H. Chevalier. With relatively brief interruptions, the theatre has been in continuous operation since.

== Premieres ==
- 1783: La caravane du Caire, opéra-ballet in three acts by André Grétry
- 1787: Tarare, opéra (tragédie lyrique) by Antonio Salieri
- 1806: Ramire, ou le fils naturel, melodrama in 3 acts by Philippe Jacques de La Roche, music by Francesco Bianchi.
- 1818: Les Deux Colons, a one-act play interspersed with verses by Joseph Aude and James Harvey D'Egville
- 1841: Les Farfadets, a "ballet-féerie" by Auguste Pilati
- 1849: Le Postillon de Saint-Valéry, opéra-comique by Auguste Pilati
- 1849: Le pasteur, ou l’evangile et le foyer, a play by Émile Souvestre and Eugène Bourgeois
- 1874: a stage version of Jules Verne's Around the World in Eighty Days, adapted by Verne and Adolphe d'Ennery, which ran 415 performances (before its subsequent very long run at the Théâtre du Châtelet)
- 1880: L'Arbre de Noël, operetta by Alexandre Charles Lecocq and Georges Jacobi
- 1887: La Tosca, written by Victorien Sardou for Sarah Bernhardt, with a hugely successful first run of 200 performances
- 1897: the original Cyrano de Bergerac, the best-known work of Edmond Rostand, with Benoît-Constant Coquelin in the title role
- 1907: The Affair of the Poisons, final play by Victorien Sardou
- 1914: Monsieur Brotonneau, play by Gaston Arman de Caillavet and Robert de Flers

Three of the above were the basis of opera libretti:

- Verdi's Stiffelio was based on Le pasteur, ou l’evangile et le foyer
- Puccini's Tosca was based on La Tosca
- Alfano's Cyrano de Bergerac was based on Cyrano de Bergerac

The theatre's other productions have included the ballet Leda, the Swiss Milkmaid (1823) and works by Dany Boon, Charles-Gaspard Delestre-Poirson and Gaston Arman de Caillavet.

== See also ==
- Suzanne Lagier
