= The Adventures of Robert Macaire =

1925 film directed by Jean Epstein

- Directed by: Jean Epstein
- Written by: Raoul Ploquin; Charles Vayre
- Starring: Jean Angelo; Suzanne Bianchetti; Marquisette Bosky
- Cinematography: Jéhan Fouquet; Paul Guichard; Nikolas Roudakoff
- Production company: Films Albatros
- Distributed by: Films Armor
- Release date: 11 December 1925
- Running time: 175 minutes
- Country: France
- Languages: Silent; French intertitles

The Adventures of Robert Macaire (1925)

The Adventures of Robert Macaire (French: Les aventures de Robert Macaire) is a 1925 French silent comedy adventure film directed by Jean Epstein and starring Jean Angelo, Suzanne Bianchetti and Marquisette Bosky. It is based on the character Robert Macaire, originally created for an 1823 play by Benjamin Antier, Saint-Amand and Polyanthe. It was released as a serial in five episodes. It was shot at the studios of Albatros Film in Montreuil. The film's sets were designed by the art director Lazare Meerson.

== Cast ==
- Jean Angelo as Robert Macaire
- Suzanne Bianchetti as Louise de Sermèze
- Marquisette Bosky as Jeanne - la fille de Robert
- Lou Dovoyna as Victoire
- Maximilienne as La fermière
- Niblia as Eugénie Mouffetard
- Alex Allin as Bertrand
- Camille Bardou as Verduron
- Nino Constantini as René de Sermèze
- Gilbert Dulong as Marquis de Sermèze
- François Viguier asBaron de Cassignol
- Jean-Pierre Stock as Vicomte de la Ferté
- René Ferté as M. de Valecure

== Bibliography ==
- Rège, Philippe. Encyclopedia of French Film Directors, Volume 1. Scarecrow Press, 2009.
- Wakeman, John. World Film Directors: 1890-1945. H.W. Wilson, 1987.
- Williams, Alan L. Republic of Images: A History of French Filmmaking. Harvard University Press, 1992.
