= Louis Ponet =

French novelist and playwright (1776–1845)

Louis Ponet (1776 in Paris – May 1845 in Paris) called Portelette, was a French novelist and playwright during the first half of the 19th century.

The son of a cook, he joined as an employee in the Treasury and then entered the administration of the Cirque-Olympique. His plays were presented inter alia at the Théâtre de l'Ambigu-Comique and the Cirque-Olympique.

== Biography ==
Louis Antoine Portelette was born on July 23, 1776, in Epinay-sous-Sénart and was baptized the following day . He is the son of Pierre Portelet, a baker, and his wife, Louise Garmand, a cook.

He started out as an employee at the Treasury and then joined the administration of the Cirque Olympique. His plays were performed at the Théâtre de l'Ambigu-Comique and the Cirque-Olympique, among other venues.

== Works ==
- 1801: La Vaccine, folie-vaudeville, in 1 act and in prose, with Charles François Jean Baptiste Moreau, 1801
- 1801: L'Hermite de vingt ans, novel
- 1801: Les Flibustiers ou la Prise de Panama, melodrama in 2 acts
- 1802: Aménaïde, ou les martyrs de la foi, historical novel
- 1802: Adolphe et Jenny, historical fact
- 1803: La Fausse Isaure, ou Le château des Alpes, drama in 3 acts, in prose and extravaganza
- 1803: Fanchon toute seule, ou Un moment d'humeur, vaudeville in 1 act
- 1805: Jules et Améline, ou l'Orphelin de Venise, novel
- 1806: Se fâchera-t-il ? ou le Pari imprudent, comedy in 1 act, mingled with vaudevilles
- 1806: Statira, ou les Frères ambitieux, melodrama in 3 acts
- 1806: M. Botte tout seul, ou le Savetier bel-esprit, vaudeville in 1 act
- 1812: Le Jeune major, ou la Prise de Berg-op-Zoom, novel
- 1814: Les femmes parisiennes, ou, Le furet de société, novel
- 1821: Le Petit Georges, ou la Croix d'honneur, comédy in 1 act, with Ferdinand Laloue
- 1823: Le Quartier du Temple ou Mon ami Beausoleil, vaudeville in 1 act, with Benjamin Antier
- 1823: La lettre anonyme, comedy in 1 act and in prose, with Charles-Maurice Descombes and Henri Franconi
- 1823: Le pâtre, melodrama in 2 acts, with H. Franconi
- 1824: Le Grenier du poète, vaudeville in 1 act, with Antier
- 1824: Les hussards, ou le maréchal des logis piémontais, mimodrama in 2 acts
- 1825: Le vieillard, ou la révélation, melodrama in 2 acts
- 1826: La liquidation, comédie-vaudeville in 1 act and in prose, with Antier
- 1828: Le Drapeau, military melodrama in 2 acts, with Auguste Anicet-Bourgeois and Adolphe Franconi

== Bibliography ==
- Joseph Marie Quérard, La France littéraire, ou Dictionnaire bibliographique des savants..., volume 7, 1835, p. 268
- Antoine-Alexandre Barbier, Olivier Alexandre Barbier, Paul Billard, Dictionnaire des ouvrages anonymes, 1875, p. 846
