= Franconi (surname) =

Franconi is an Italian surname. Notable people with the surname include:

- Adolphe Franconi (1801–1855), French playwright and circus performer
- Antonio Franconi (1737–1836), Italian equestrian
- Elio Franconi, Argentinian wrestler
- Elsa Franconi-Poretti (1895–1995), Swiss politician
- Francesco Franconi, Swiss motorcycle racer
- Gabriel-Tristan Franconi (1887–1918), French poet of Swiss-Italian origin
- Henri Franconi (1779–1849), French playwright and circus performer
- Ippolito Franconi (1593–1653), Italian Roman Catholic bishop
- Laurent Franconi (1776–1849), French film director and circus performer
- Victor Franconi (1811–1897), French circus performer

== See also ==
- Villa Franconi
- Cirque Franconi
- DJ Keoki, alternative stage name Keoki Franconi
- Joachim Murat, nicknamed King Franconi
