= Henry Villemot =

French playwright (c.1796–1870)

Henry Villemot (c.1796–1870) was a 19th-century French playwright.

== Works ==
- 1823: Le Vendredi d'un usurier, comedy in 1 act
- 1823: Les Hussards dans l'étude, folie-vaudeville in 1 act, with Jules Dulong
- 1824: Le Plâtrier ou la double accusation, melodrama in 2 acts, with Théodore Nézel
- 1824: La Prise de Tarifa, mélodrame militaire historique in 1 act, with Nézel and Ferdinand Laloue
- 1825: Le Flâneur, comédie vaudeville in 1 act
- 1825: Le Chemin creux, melodrama in 3 acts, extravaganza
- 1825: Les Ruines de la Granca, mélodrame in 3 acts, with Dulong and Saint-Amand
- 1826: L'Amour et les poules, comédie-vaudeville in 1 act
- 1827: Le Garde et le bucheron, melodrama in 2 tableaux
- 1828: Bisson, melodrama in 2 acts and in 5 parts, extravaganza, with Benjamin Antier and Nézel
- 1828: Le Remplaçant, melodrama in 3 acts, with Antier
- 1829: La Partie d'ânes, folie in 1 act
- 1830: La Prise de la Bastille, gloire populaire et le passage du Mont-St-Bernard, gloire militaire, play in 2 periods and 7 tableaux
- 1830: Les Deux soufflets, comedy in 1 act, with Saint-Amand
- 1830: La Vieille des Vosges, melodrama in 2 acts, with Saint-Amand
- 1830: Youli, ou les Souliotes, melodrama in 2 acts and 5 tableaux, with Henri Franconi and Nézel
- 1831: Mingrat, melodrama in 4 acts, with Laloue
- 1831: Les Lions de Mysore, play in 3 acts and 7 tableaux, with Dulong

== Bibliography ==
- Joseph Marie Quérard, La France littéraire ou dictionnaire bibliographique des savants, historiens, 1837, p. 215
