= Auguste Arnould =

French poet, playwright, historian, novelist and essayist

Auguste Jean François Arnould
- Born: 29 April 1803; Paris
- Died: 8 March 1854 (aged 50); Saint Petersburg
- Occupations: Poet, playwright, historian, novelist and essayist
- Spouse: Jeanne Sylvanie Arnould-Plessy

Auguste Jean François Arnould (29 April 1803 – 8 March 1854) was a French poet, playwright, historian, novelist and essayist of the first half of the 19th century.

He first studied law to become a lawyer but did not feel the vocation and preferred to devote himself to literature.

His plays were presented on the most famous Parisian stages of the 19th century: Théâtre du Vaudeville, Théâtre de la Porte-Saint-Martin, Théâtre de la Renaissance, Théâtre de l'Odéon, Comédie-Française etc.

Married to the actress Jeanne Sylvanie Arnould-Plessy of the Comédie française, He died in Saint Petersburg, where he had accompanied her on a tour.

== Works ==
=== Theatre ===
- 1829: La Vieille fille et la jeune veuve, comedy in 1 act and in verses, with Narcisse Fournier
- 1831: L'homme au masque de fer, drama in 5 acts and in prose, with Fournier
- 1831: La poupée ou l'Écolier en bonne fortune, comedy mingled with couplets, with Fournier
- 1831: Les Secrets de cour, comédie anecdotique in 1 act and in prose, with Fournier
- 1831: La Sœur cadette, comedy in 1 act, in verses, with Fournier
- 1831: Catherine II, comedy in 3 acts and in prose, with Lockroy
- 1832: La Rente viagère, comédie-vaudeville in 1 act, with Fournier
- 1832: Un mariage corse, comédie-vaudeville in 1 act, with Lockroy and Fournier
- 1833: C'est encore du bonheur ou Le prédestiné, comédie-vaudeville in 3 acts, with Lockroy
- 1834: L'Interprète, comédie-vaudeville in 1 act, with Fournier
- 1834: Un Mariage à rompre, comédie-vaudeville in 1 act, with Fournier
- 1835: Les deux reines, opéra comique in 1 act, with Frédéric Soulié
- 1836: Le frère de Piron, comédie vaudeville in 1 act, with Lockroy
- 1836: Les Jours gras sous Charles IX, historical drama in 3 acts, with Lockroy
- 1837: La vieillesse d'un grand roi, drama in 3 acts, with Lockroy
- 1837: Huit ans de plus, drama in 3 acts, with Fournier
- 1838: Les suites d'une faute, drama in 5 acts, in prose, with Fournier
- 1839: Claude Stocq, drama in 4 acts, preceded by prologue, with Fournier
- 1840: Un secret, drama in 3 acts, mingled with couplets, with Fournier
- 1841: La fête des fous, drama in 5 acts, with Fournier
- 1841: Le Dérivatif, comedy in 1 act, mingled with couplets
- 1841: La Maschera, opéra comique in 2 acts
- 1842: Les Fiancées d'Herbesheim, with Lockroy
- 1843: L'Extase, comedy in 3 acts, mingled with song, with Lockroy and Alexandre Pierre Joseph Doche
- 1844: Un Amant malheureux, comédie-vaudeville en 2 acts
- 1845: Une Bonne Réputation, comedy in 1 act, in prose
- 1845: Le Droit d'aînesse, comédie-vaudeville in 1 act, with Fournier
- 1867: Les Ruines du Château noir, drama in 9 tableaux, including a prologue, with Fournier and Henri Horace Meyer, (posthumous)

=== History ===
- 1833: Struensée, ou La reine et le favori, 2 vol.
- 1835: Alexis Petrowitch (histoire russe de 1715 à 1718), with N. Fournier
- 1839-1840: Crimes célèbres, 8 vol., with Alexandre Dumas, Pier-Angelo Fiorentino, Narcisse Fournier and Félicien Mallefille
- 1841: Fille, femme et veuve
- 1841: Adèle Launay
- 1844: Histoire de la Bastille depuis sa fondation (1374) jusqu'à sa destruction (1789), with Auguste Maquet and Jules-Édouard Alboize de Pujol
- 1849: Les Jésuites depuis leur origine jusqu'à nos jours, histoire, types, mœurs, mystères
- 1854: Jeanne de Naples

=== Poetry ===
- 1838: A la belle étoile
- 1840: Hégésippe Moreau. Le Myosotis
- 1842: La roue de fortune

=== Novels ===
- 1840: La Mère-folle
- 1844: Les Trois aveugles, with Alexandre de Lavergne
- 1847: Tout chemin mène à Rome, with de Lavergne
- 1849: Une lettre anonyme

== Bibliography ==
- Ferdinand Natanael Staaff, La littérature française: depuis la formation de la langue, 1869, p. 848-849
- Alfred Louis Edmond Vallettee, Mercure de France, vol.247, 1933, p. 239
- John Armstrong Sellards, Dans le sillage du romantisme: Charles Didier (1805-1864), 1933, p. 122
- Philippe Boitel, Les Français qui ont fait la France, 2009, p. 68
