= Adolphe Franconi =

French playwright and circus performer

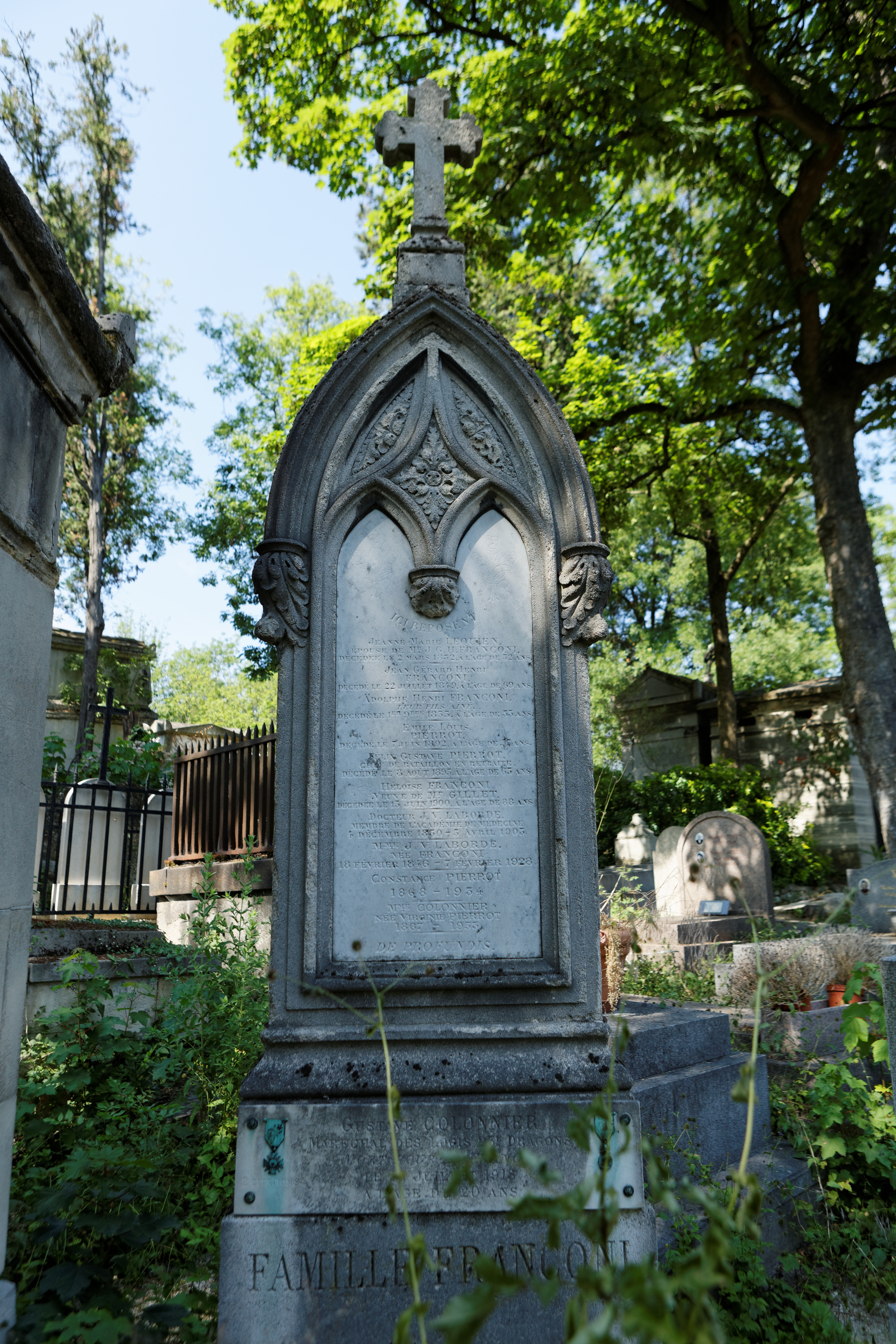
- His grave at the Père Lachaise Cemetery
- Born: Henri Adolphe Franconi; 1801
- Died: 2 November 1855 (aged 53–54); Paris, France
- Occupations: Playwright, circus performer

Henri Adolphe Franconi (1801 – 2 November 1855) was a French playwright and circus performer.

A grandson of Antonio Franconi and son of Henri Franconi, he succeeded him in 1827 as managing director of the Cirque-Olympique. He specialized in training horses. In 1835, he forged an association with Louis Dejean in order to establish a circus tent on the Champs-Élysées, at the Carré Marigny.

He died of a heart attack at the Cirque-Olympique in 1855.

== Works ==
- 1819: Le Soldat laboureur, mimodrama en 1 act
- 1828: Le Chien du régiment, ou l'Exécution militaire, melodrama in 1 act, with Henri Franconi
- 1828: Le Drapeau, military melodrama in 2 acts, a show with Louis Ponet and Auguste Anicet-Bourgeois
- 1828: L'éléphant du roi de Siam, mimodrama in nine tableaux, with Léopold Chandezon and Ferdinand Laloue, (mise-en-scène)
- 1830, L'Empereur, historical events in 5 actes and 18 tableaux, with Ferdinand Laloue and Auguste Lepoitevin de L'Égreville
- 1855: Le Cavalier : cours d'équitation pratique, Michel Lévy brothers

== Bibliography ==
- Artaud de Montor, Encyclopédie des gens du monde, 1839, p. 595
- Alphonse Karr, Notice nécrologique, in Les Bourdonnements du siècle issue 25, 25 November 1855
- Camille Dreyfus, André Berthelot, La Grande encyclopédie: inventaire raisonné des sciences..., 1886, p. 55
- Henry Lyonnet, Dictionnaire des comédiens français, 1911, p. 83
