= Alexandre Pierre Joseph Doche =

French composer and conductor

Alexandre Pierre Joseph Doche (Paris, 1799 – Saint Petersburg, 31 July 1849) was a French violinist and composer, conductor at the Théâtre du Vaudeville from 1828 to 1848.

The son of Joseph-Denis Doche, he studied at the Conservatoire de Paris and succeeded his father as composer and conductor at the Théâtre du Vaudeville.

In January 1839, he married the Belgian actress Marie-Charlotte-Eugénie de Plunkett, known as Eugénie Doche after him. In 1848 he appeared at the theatre of Saint-Petersburg but suddenly died of cholera in 1849.

== Works ==
=== Theatre ===
- 1838: A trente ans, ou une femme raisonnable, comedy in three acts mingled with couplets, with Joseph-Bernard Rosier
- 1840: Bonaventure, comédie-vaudeville in three acts and four tableaux, with Frédéric de Courcy and Charles Dupeuty
- 1841: La Journée d'une jolie femme, vaudeville, lyrics by Adolphe d'Ennery and Eugène Cormon
- 1843: L'Extase, comedy in three acts, mingled with song, with Auguste Arnould and Lockroy
- 1844: La Polka, vaudeville, with Alexis Decomberousse and Éléonore Tenaille de Vaulabelle

=== Songs and compositions ===
- 1842: L'Enlèvement des Sabines, quadrille for piano
- 1842: La Journée d'une jolie femme, grande valse brillante, arranged for piano
- 1843: Couplets de la mouche, in Album de chant du Monde musical
- 1844: L'Ame du prieur, ballade, lyrics by Bérardi
- 1844: Chantez, dansez, aimez, chansonnette, lyrics by Bérardi
- 1844: Chien et chat, chansonnette, lyrics by Bérardi
- 1844: La Confession, romance, lyrics by Bérardi
- 1844: Que t'ai-je fait ?, romance, lyrics by Bérardi
- 1844: Satan ou le Diable à Paris, quadrille brilliant
- 1847: Régaillette, complets chantés dans Le Chevalier d'Essonne, lyrics by Auguste Anicet-Bourgeois
- 1850: Le regard Mélodie, lyrics by Louise Schiltz
- 1851: Le Carnaval à l'assemblée nationale, lyrics by Gustave Nadaud
- 1852: La Lorette de la veille, melody without accent, lyrics by Gustave Nadaud
- undated: La Muse comique, collective collection of ditties, songs, bawdy, pastoral, roundels, comic scenes, drinking songs and light songs with and without talking, for piano and voice, lyrics by Pierre-Antoine-Augustin de Piis, (with Étienne Arnaud, Amédée de Beauplan, François-Auguste Gevaert, Aristide Hignard, Paul de Kock, Adrien Lagard, Charles Lecocq, Sylvain Mangeant, Charles Pourny, Loïsa Puget, Victor Robillard, Jean-Pierre Solié and Alphonse Thys
- undated: Les Formats, rondeau, lyrics by A. Faillot
- undated: Poèmes et chansons d'Eugène de Pradel relatifs à Bruxelles
- undated: Je pense à toi, romance, lyrics by P. Sain
- undated: Valse du mari par interim by Fulgence de Bury, (for piano or harp)

== Bibliography ==
- François-Joseph Fétis, Biographie universelle des musiciens, 1837, p. 319
- Eugène de Montalembert, Claude Abromont, Guide des genres de la musique occidentale, 2010
