= Charles-Hippolyte Dubois-Davesnes =

French playwright (1800–1874)

Charles-Hippolyte Dubois
- Born: 23 December 1800; Former 5th arrondissement of Paris
- Died: 29 June 1874 (aged 73); 16th arrondissement of Paris
- Occupations: Playwright, actor, theatre director and theatre manager.

Charles-Hippolyte Dubois, better known as Dubois-Davesnes, (23 December 1800 [2 nivôse an IX] – 29 June 1874) was a 19th-century French playwright, actor, theatre director and theatre manager.

The sculptor Marguerite-Fanny Dubois-Davesnes (1832-1900) was his daughter.

== Biography ==
A jeweler worker and first prize for tragedy, he began his career at a very young age and aged 16 had his first play Maître Frontin à Londres presented at Théâtre de la Gaîté 17 April 1816. He made his actor debut 29 October 1822 at Théâtre de l'Odéon then was hired at Théâtre de l'Ambigu-Comique (1825), at théâtre du Vaudeville (1827–1828), again at l'Ambigu (1828-1829) then at l'Odéon (1830) where he obtained a great success in La Tour de Nesle by Alexandre Dumas.

Stage director of the Théâtre du Gymnase then of the Théâtre des Variétés (1830-1850), he was general manager of the Théâtre-Français from 1850 to 1873. His plays were given on the most important Parisian stages of his time.

He also used the pen names Davenne, Davesne, Dubois, Dubois aîné and Dubois d'Avesnes.

== Works ==
- 1816: Maître Frontin à Londres, comedy in 1 act
- 1827: L'Obligeant maladroit, comedy in 1 act mingled with couplets
- 1828: Julien et Justine, ou Encore des ingénus, tableau villageois, with Charles Desnoyer
- 1829: Caïn, drama in 2 tableaux mingled with music, with Pierre-François Beauvallet
- 1829: Le Ménage du maçon, ou les Mauvaises connaissances, dramatic play in 6 days, with Desnoyer
- 1830: La Leçon de dessin, ou Mon ami Polycarpe, comedy in 1 act, with Desnoyer
- 1830: Les Trois jours, chant dithyrambique, with Pierre-François Beauvallet
- 1832: Notre-Dame de Paris, drama in 3 acts and 7 tableaux after the novel by Victor Hugo
- 1834: Les Bons maris font les bonnes femmes, comédie-vaudeville in 3 acts, with Auguste Lepoitevin de L'Égreville and Valory
- 1836: Le Muet d'Ingouville, comédie-vaudeville in 2 acts, with Jean-François-Alfred Bayard and Hugues Bouffé
- 1837: Farruck le Maure, drama in 3 acts
- 1838: Candinot, roi de Rouen, vaudeville in 2 acts, with Bouffé, Eugène Moreau, and Henri Horace Meyer
- 1840: Le Père Turlututu, ou les Souvenirs, comédie-vaudeville in 1 act
- 1840: Megani, ou les Comédiens du grand duc, comédie-vaudeville in 3 acts
- 1842: Marie, ou Un dévouement de jeune fille, drame vaudeville in 3 acts
- 1844: Une chaîne à rompre, vaudeville in 1 act
- 1844: Fleur-de-Genêt, comédie-vaudeville in 2 acts
- 1844: La Parisienne, comédie-vaudeville in 2 acts, with Émile Souvestre
- 1845: Une nuit terrible, vaudeville in 1 act, with Saintine
- 1846: Pierre Février, comédie-vaudeville in 1 act
- 1848: La Reine d'Yvetot, vaudeville in 1 act
- 1863: Les Vapeurs de la marquise, comédie-vaudeville en 1 act

== Bibliography ==
- Georges d'Heylli, Dictionnaire des pseudonymes, E. Dentu, 1869 (2e éd.), p. 90
- Henry Lyonnet, Dictionnaire des comédiens français, 1911
