= Théodore Nézel =

French playwright and librettist (1799–1854)

- Born: 25 February 1799; Paris, France
- Died: 23 May 1854 (aged 55); Paris, France
- Occupations: Playwright, librettist

Théodore Nézel (25 February 1799 – 23 May 1854) was a 19th-century French playwright and librettist.

An employee at the ministry of public instruction, he was appointed managing director of the Théâtre du Panthéon in September 1936. His plays, often signed "Théodore" or "Théodore N.", were presented on the most important Parisian stages of the 19th century, including the Théâtre de l'Ambigu, the Théâtre des Nouveautés, the Théâtre du Palais-Royal, and the Théâtre des Variétés.

== Works ==
- La Famille irlandaise, melodrama in 3 acts, 1821
- L'Aubergiste malgré lui, comédie proverbe, with Nicolas Brazier, 1823
- La Chambre de Clairette, ou les Visites par la fenêtre, vaudeville in 1 act, with Armand Joseph Overnay, 1825
- Les Deux réputations, comédie-vaudeville in 1 act, with Overnay, 1825
- Six mois de constance, comedy in 1 act, mingled with couplets, with Overnay and Constant Berrier, 1825
- Le Banqueroutier, melodrama in 3 acts, with Overnay, 1826
- La Couturière, drama in 3 acts, with Overnay, 1826
- La dame voilée, comedy in 3 acts, with Constant Berrier and Overnay, 1826
- La Nuit des noces, drama in 3 acts, with Overnay, 1826
- Cartouche, melodrama in 3 acts, with Overnay, 1827
- Poulailler, melodrama in 9 acts, with Antier, 1827
- Bisson, melodrama in 2 acts and in 5 parts, extravaganza, with Benjamin Antier, 1828
- Le Chasseur noir, melodrama in 3 acts extravaganza, with Antier, Overnay and Frédérick Lemaître, 1828
- La Demoiselle et la paysanne, comedy in 1 act and in prose, 1828
- La Nourrice sur lieu, scènes de famille, mingled with couplets, with Armand-François Jouslin de La Salle, Louis Gabriel Montigny and Jean-Gilbert Ymbert, 1828
- Les lanciers et les marchandes de modes, one-act play, mingled with couplets, with Antier, Overnay and E. F. Varez, 1828
- Roc l'exterminateur, melodrama comic in 3 parts, with Adrien Payn, 1828
- Isaure, drama in 3 acts, mingled with songs, with Antier and Francis Cornu, 1829
- La partie d'ânes, folie in 1 act, with Saint-Amand and Henry Villemot, 1829
- Rochester, drama in 3 acts and in 6 parts, with Antier, 1829
- John Bull, ou le Chaudronnier anglais, two-act play, with Overney and E. F. Varez, 1830
- Napoléon en paradis, vaudeville in 1 act, with Antoine Simonnin and Antier, 1830
- La prise de la Bastille; Passage du Mont Saint-Bernard, gloire populaire, with Villemot and Laloue, 1830
- Youli, ou les Souliotes, melodrama in 2 acts and 5 tableaux, with Villemot and Henri Franconi, 1830
- Les Massacres, fièvre cérébrale in 3 acts and in vers casrés ["sic"], prececed by Le Diable au spectacle, prologue, with Antier, 1831
- Les Six degrés du crime, melodrama in 3 acts, with Antier, 1831
- L'Arlequin et le Pape, historical vaudeville in 1 act, with Simonnin, 1831
- Catherine II, ou l'Impératrice et le Cosaque, play in 2 acts, extravaganza, mingled with couplets, with Simonnin, 1831
- Joachim Murat, historical drama in 4 acts and 9 tableaux, with Antier and Alexis Decomberousse, 1831
- Les Lions de Mysore, play in 3 acts and 7 tableaux, 1831
- La Papesse Jeanne, vaudeville-anecdote in 1 act, with Simonnin, 1831
- Le Pâtissier usurpateur, historical play in 5 little acts, with Simonnin and Antier, 1831
- Le Tir et le restaurant, comédie-vaudeville in 1 act, with Overnay and Payn, 1831
- L’Âne mort et la femme guillotinée, folie-vaudeville in 3 acts, with Simonnin, 1832
- Le Cuisinier politique, vaudeville non politique, in 1 act, with Simonnin, 1832
- Le Curé et les chouans, comedy in 1 act and in prose, with Simonnin, 1832
- La Jeune comtesse, comédie-vaudeville in 1 act, with Simonnin, 1832
- Le Suicide d'une jeune fille, drama in 3 acts, imitated from the German language, with Antier and Hyacinthe de Flers, 1832
- Zerline, ou le Peintre et la courtisane, vaudeville in 1 act, with Simonnin, 1832
- La Peau de chagrin, ou le Roman en action, romantic extravaganza, comédie-vaudeville in 3 acts, with Simonnin, 1831
- Dieu et diable, ou la Conversion de Mme Dubarry, historical vaudeville in 1 act, with Simonnin, 1833
- Judith et Holopherne, épisode de la 1re guerre d'Espagne, vaudeville in 2 acts, with Emmanuel Théaulon, 1834
- L'art de quitter sa maîtresse, ou Les premiers présents de l'amour, tableau-vaudeville in 1 act, with Simonnin, 1834
- 1834 et 1835, ou le Déménagement de l'année, revue épisodique in 1 act, with Théaulon and Frédéric de Courcy, 1834
- L'Idiote, comédie-vaudeville in 1 act, with Théaulon, 1834
- Trois ans après, ou la Sommation respectueuse, drama in 4 acts, with Auguste-Louis-Désiré Boulé, 1834
- La prova d'un opera seria ou Les italiens à Carpentras, opéra-bouffe in 1 act, with Théaulon, 1835
- Les bédouins à la barrière, folie-vaudeville in 1 act, with Eugène Ronteix, 1836
- Le Sabotier ambitieux, comical drama in 4 acts and 3 tableaux, mingled with couplets, with Théophile Marion Dumersan, 1836
- L'Enfant de Paris, ou Misère et liberté, vaudeville in 1 act, with Overnay, 1838
- Paul Jones, drama in 5 acts, in prose, with Alexandre Dumas père, 1838
- Brisquet, ou L'héritage de mon oncle, comédie-vaudeville in 2 acts, with Ferdinand Laloue, 1843
- Vautrin et Frise-Poulet, folie-vaudeville in 1 act, with Mélesville, 1848
- Titine à la cour, vaudeville, with Félix Dutertre de Véteuil, 1849
- Louise de Vaulcroix, drama in 5 acts, with prologue and epilogue, with Paul de Guerville, 1850
- Les Filles de l'air, folie-vaudeville in 1 act, with the Cogniard brothers, 1851
- Les Violettes de Lucette, vaudeville in 2 acts, with Dutertre, 1852
- Mil huit cent trente quatre et mil huit cent trente cinq, revue, with Théaulon, undated

== General references ==
- Joseph Marie Quérard, Gustave Brunet, Pierre Jannet, Les supercheries littéraires dévoilées, 1869, p. 1070
