= Jean-Baptiste-Rose-Bonaventure Violet d'Épagny =

French playwright and writer (1787–1868)

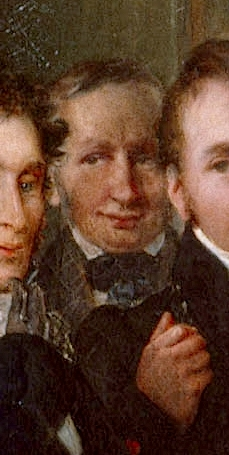
- Born: 30 August 1787; Gray, Haute-Saône
- Died: 4 November 1868 (aged 81); Paris
- Occupations: Poet, journalist, writer

Jean-Baptiste-Rose-Bonaventure Violet d'Épagny (30 August 1787 – 4 November 1868) was a French playwright, poet, journalist and writer.

== Biography ==
He studied at Dijon, then moved to Paris to study law. An employee at the Ministry of Foreign Affairs, he became a lawyer after the upheaval of the Imperial Government. An editor in several newspapers, he made his debut at the Théâtre-Français in 1819 with a three-act in verses comedy, L’École des Exagérés.

A managing director of the Théâtre de l'Odéon (1841), his plays were performed on the most significant Parisian stages of his time: Odéon, Comédie-Française, Théâtre de la Porte-Saint-Martin etc.

He was made a chevalier of the Légion d'honneur 4 March 1831.

== Works ==
- 1819 : L’École des Exagérés, comedy in three acts and in verse,
- 1820 : Les Rivaux de village ou La cruche cassée, opéra comique in one act, with Corvey
- 1825 : Luxe et indigence ou le Ménage parisien, comedy in 5 acts
- 1825 : La Dame du lac, opera héroïque in four acts, with Jean-Frédéric-Auguste Lemière de Corvey and Auguste Rousseau, 1825
- 1825 : Brelan d'amoureux, ou les Trois soufflets, vaudeville in 1 act, with Charles Nombret Saint-Laurent and X.-B. Saintine
- 1827 : L'Homme habile, ou Tout pour parvenir, comedy in 5 acts and in verse
- 1829 : Lancaster, ou l'Usurpation, play in 5 acts, in verse
- 1830 : L'Auberge d'Auray, drame lyrique in 1 act, with Charles-François-Jean-Baptiste Moreau de Commagny, music by Ferdinand Harold and Michele Carafa
- 1830 : Les Hommes du lendemain, comedy in 1 act, in verse
- 1831 : Dominique ou Le possédé, comedy in 3 acts, with Henri Dupin
- 1831 : Jacques Clément, ou le Bachelier et le théologien, drama in 5 acts and in prose
- 1831 : Joscelin et Guillemette, comedy in 1 act, with a prologue
- 1831 : Les Préventions, comédy in 1 act, titled Proverbes by Théodore Leclercq and arranged for the stage, with Dupin
- 1832 : L'Anniversaire de la naissance de Molière, à-propos in one act
- 1833 : La Parfumeuse de la cour, comedy in 1 act, with Dupin
- 1834 : Les mal-contents de 1579, drama in 5 acts, with Alexandre Jarry
- 1834 : Charles III, ou l'inquisition, drama-comedy in 4 acts, with Saintine
- 1835 : La Fille mal élevée, comédie en vaudevilles in 2 acts, with Alexis Decomberousse
- 1838 : Les Adieux au pouvoir, comedy in one act, with Théodore Baudouin d'Aubigny
- 1841 : Claire Champrosé, drama in 1 act
- 1843 : Le Bon génie de la jeunesse. Traité d'éducation publié sous le patronage de la Reine
- 1844 : Les Abus de Paris
- 1844 : Le Mannequin du prince, drame-vaudeville in 3 acts, with Benjamin Antier and Henri Horace Meyer
- 1848 : Convenances d'argent, comédy in three acts, in verse
- 1848 : Mon pays, études poétiques sociales
- 1848 : La Curée des places
- 1848 : La Fille de l'émigré, episode of the Restauration
- 1849 : Une Double leçon, comedy in 1 act, in verse
- 1852 : Une Haine au moyen âge, 2 vols.
- 1853 : Nouvelles
- 1853 : Satire contre Napoléon III
- 1855 : Le Dernier jour, oratorio
- 1859 : A la France sur l'expédition d'Italie et la conquête de la Lombardie
- 1860 : Mes vœux à sa Majesté l'Empereur, le jour de sa fête. La Salutation angélique à sa Majesté l'Impératrice
- 1861 : A Sa Majesté l'Empereur, le jour de l'an 1861, epistol
- 1862 : A Sa Majesté l'empereur Napoléon III, au jour de l'an 1862, epistol
- 1868 : Un salon aristocratique avec nos deux noblesses, followed by a lettre à M. le comte de Montalembert
- 1864 : Les Eaux du Loiret, hommage to M. Vignat, mayor of d'Orléans
- 1865 : Molière et Scribe

== Bibliography ==
- Louis Gustave Vapereau, Dictionnaire universel des contemporains, 1870, (p. 632)
- Camille Dreyfus, André Berthelot, La Grande encyclopédie, vol.16, 1886, (p. 7)
