= Alexis Decomberousse =

French playwright (1793–1862)

- Born: Alexis Barbe Benoît Decomberousse; 13 January 1793; Vienne, Isère
- Died: 22 November 1862 (aged 69); Paris
- Occupations: Playwright, vaudevillist

Alexis Decomberousse, full name Alexis Barbe Benoît Decomberousse, (13 January 1793 – 22 November 1862) was a 19th-century French playwright and vaudevillist.

His plays were presented on the most important Parisian stages of the 19th century such as the Théâtre de l'Ambigu, Théâtre du Palais-Royal, Théâtre des Variétés, Théâtre du Gymnase, Théâtre de la Gaîté, Théâtre de la Porte-Saint-Martin etc.).

== Works ==
- Le Cocher de fiacre, melodrama in 3 acts, with Benjamin Antier, 1825
- Le Pauvre de l'Hôtel-Dieu, mélodrama in 3 acts, with Antier, 1826
- Le Prisonnier amateur, comedy mingled with couplets, with Armand d'Artois, Ferdinand Laloue and Frédérick Lemaître, 1826
- Le Vieil Artiste, ou la Séduction, melodrama in 3 acts, with Frédérick Lemaître, 1826
- Le Fou, drama in 3 acts, with Antony Béraud and Gustave Drouineau, 1829
- La Maîtresse, comédie-vaudeville in 2 acts, with Hippolyte Le Roux and Merville, 1829
- Le Fils de Louison, melodrama in 3 acts, with Antier, 1830
- L'incendiaire ou la cure et l'archevêché, drama in 3 acts, with Antier, 1831
- Joachim Murat, historical drama in 4 acts and 9 tableaux, with Antier and Théodore Nézel, 1831
- Les Jumeaux de La Réole, ou les Frères Faucher, drama in 3 acts and 7 tableaux, with Michel-Nicolas Balisson de Rougemont, 1831
- 1832: L'Abolition de la peine de mort, drama in 3 acts and 6 tableaux, with Benjamin Antier and J.-S. Raffard-Brienne
- Une bonne fortune, comédie vaudeville in 1 act, with Jean-François-Alfred Bayard, 1832
- La Fille du soldat, comédie-vaudeville in 2 acts, with Ancelot, 1832
- La Nuit d'avant, vaudeville in 2 acts, with Ancelot, 1832
- Le Serrurier, comedy in 1 act, mingled with vaudevilles, with Bayard, 1832
- Aimer et mourir, 1833
- Madame d'Egmont ou Sont-elles deux ?, comedy in 3 acts, with Ancelot, 1833
- L'Aspirant de marine, opéra-comique in 2 acts, with Edmond Rochefort, 1833
- La consigne, comédie-vaudeville in 1 act, with Ancelot, 1833
- Louis XI en goguettes, vaudeville in 1 act, with F. de Bury, 1833
- La Salle de bains, vaudeville in 2 acts, with Antier, 1833
- Les Suites d'une séparation, comédie-vaudeville in 1 act, with Paul Duport, 1833
- Fretillon ou La bonne fille, vaudeville in 5 acts, with Bayard, 1834
- Salvoisy ou L'amoureux de la Reine, with Michel-Nicolas Balisson de Rougemont and Eugène Scribe, 1834
- Le Capitaine de vaisseau ou La salamandre; preceded by La carotte d'or, prologue, vaudeville nautique in 2 acts, with Benjamin Antier and Mélesville, 1834
- L'Ami Grandet, comedy in 3 acts, mingled with couplets, with Jacques-François Ancelot, 1834
- Le Dernier de la famille, comédie-vaudeville in 1 act, with Ancelot, 1834
- Le Domino rose, comédie-vaudeville-anecdote in 2 acts, with Ancelot, 1834
- Un secret de famille, drama in 4 acts, with Ancelot, 1834
- Les Tours de Notre-Dame, anecdote du temps de Charles VII, with Antier, 1834
- Le Père Goriot, drama-vaudeville in 3 acts, with Ernest Jaime and Emmanuel Théaulon, 1835
- L'Autorité dans l'embarras, comédie-vaudeville in 1 act, with Ernest Jaime, 1835
- La Fille mal élevée, comédie-vaudeville in 2 acts, with Jean-Baptiste-Rose-Bonaventure Violet d'Épagny, 1835
- Le Violon de l'opéra, comédie-vaudeville in 1 act, with Augustin-Théodore de Lauzanne de Vauroussel, 1835
- Les Deux Nourrices, vaudeville in 1 act, with Bayard, 1835
- Le Tapissier, comedy in 3 acts, mingled with songs, with Ancelot, 1835
- Avis aux coquettes, ou L'amant singulier, comédie-vaudeville in 2 acts, with Eugène Scribe, 1836
- Le Colleur, comédie-vaudeville in 1 act, with B. Antier, 1836
- La Liste des notables, comedy in 2 acts, mingled with couplets, with Charles Dupeuty, 1836
- La Reine d'un jour, chronique mauresque in 2 acts, with Antier, 1836
- La Comtesse du Tonneau, ou Les deux cousines, 1837
- Vive le galop !, folie-vaudeville in 1 act, with Cogniard brothers and Lubize, 1837
- Vouloir, c'est pouvoir, comedy in 2 acts, mingled with song, with Ancelot, 1837
- Le Serment de collège, comedy in 1 act, mingled with couplets, 1838
- Un frère de quinze ans, comédie-vaudeville in 1 act, with Achille d'Artois, 1838
- Le Tireur de cartes, vaudeville en 1 acte, with Eugène Roche, 1838
- Le marché de Saint-Pierre, melodrama in 5 acts, with Antier, 1839
- Le Cheval de Crequi, comedy in 2 acts and 3 parts, 1839
- Les Maris vengés, comédie-vaudeville in 5 acts, with Étienne Arago and Eugène Roche, 1839
- La Grisette de Bordeaux, vaudeville in 1 act, 1840
- L'Honneur d'une femme, drama in 3 acts, with Antier, 1840
- Une journée chez Mazarin, comedy in 1 act, mingled with couplets, with Fulgence de Bury and Théodore Muret, 1840
- Van Bruck, rentier, comédie-vaudeville in 2 acts, with Narcisse Fournier, 1841
- Les Filets de Saint-Cloud, drama in 5 acts, with B. Antier, 1842
- Touboulic le cruel, vaudeville in 1 act, with Ancelot, 1843
- La Polka en Province, folie-vaudeville in 1 act, with Jules Cordier, 1844
- La Sainte-Cécile, opéra comique in 3 acts, with Ancelot, 1844
- Un mystère, comedy in 2 acts, mingled with couplets, with Ancelot, 1844
- Juanita ou Volte-face, comédie-vaudeville in 2 acts, with Bayard, 1846
- La Carotte d'or, comédie-vaudeville in 1 act, with Benjamin Antier and Mélesville, 1846
- L'Homme qui se cherche, comédie-vaudeville in 1 act, with Eugène Roche, 1846
- Le chapeau gris, ou Les obstacles, comédie-vaudeville in 1 act, with Édouard Brisebarre, 1847
- La Vapeur d'éther ou sans douleur !, vaudeville in 1 act, with Hippolyte Lefebvre, 1847
- Un amant qui ne veut pas être heureux, vaudeville in 1 act, with Lubize, 1850
- Les Trois Coups de pied, comédie-vaudeville in 2 acts, with Lockroy, 1851
- Théâtre de Alexis de Comberousse, foreword by Jules Janin, 3 vol, 1864

== Bibliography ==
- Louis Gustave Vapereau, Léon Garnier, Dictionnaire universel des contemporains, 1865, p. 485 (Read on line)
- Stéphane Vachon, 1850, tombeau d'Honoré de Balzac, 2007, p. 538
