= Jean-Baptiste-Louis Camel =

French playwright

Jean-Baptiste-Louis Camel was an early 19th-century French playwright.

An actor at Théâtre de la Gaîté and Théâtre de l'Ambigu, his plays were performed in these venues as well as at Cirque-Olympique.

== Works ==
- 1806: Les Amans du Pont-aux-biches ou la Place publique, vaudeville poissard in one act and in prose
- 1806: Le Solitaire forcé, ou chacun son tour, one-act comédie en vaudeville
- 1808: M. Quinquina et Melle Bourache, one-act folie-vaudeville
- 1809: Le Lovelace de la Halle, one-act folie poissarde
- 1811: Le Château d'eau du boulevard, cascade d'inauguration in 1 act, mingled with couplets
- 1811: Richardini, ou les Aqueducs de Cosenza, three-act melodrama
- 1812: La Famille d'Armincourt, ou les Voleurs, tableaux de Boilly mis en action, two-act pantomime, with Henri Franconi
- 1817: Le bon Français, ou l'Ami des lys, tableau d'inauguration, et mariage du lys et de la rose
- 1817: L'impromptu du cœur, vaudeville impromptu in one act and in prose
- 1818: Le Pouvoir de la reconnaissance ou le Menuisier de Touraine, comédie-anecdote in 1 act, in prose mingled with vaudevilles
- 1822: De l'influence des théâtres et particulièrement des théâtres secondaires sur les mœurs du peuple
- 1823: La Corvette l'Espérance , one-act tableau-vaudeville for the inauguration of the new venur in Le Havre, 24 August
- 1825: Une heure au camp de Maizières, one-act tableau militaire

== Bibliography ==
- Frédéric Jules Faber, Histoire du théâtre français en Belgique depuis son origine jusqu'à nos jours: d'après des documents inédits reposant aux archives générales du royaume, Volume 4, 1880, (p. 319)
