= Adrien Payn =

French novelist and playwright

Adrien Henri Payn (Paris, 30 July 1800 – Montévrain, 3 October 1855) was a 19th-century French novelist and playwright.

His plays were presented on the most important Parisian stages of the 19th-century, including the Théâtre de l'Ambigu-Comique, the Théâtre du Gymnase-Dramatique and the Théâtre de la Porte-Saint-Martin. In collaboration with Benjamin Antier and Polyanthe, Payn authored the famous drama l’Auberge des Adrets.

Payn was the mayor of the city of Montévrain from 1848 to 1854. He died aged 55.

== Works ==
- 1823: La Cousine supposée, comedy in 1 act and in prose, with René Perin and Villard
- 1828: Roc l'exterminateur, melodrama comique in 3 acts, with Théodore Nézel
- 1831: Le Tir et le restaurant, comédie-vaudeville in 1 act, with Nézel and Armand Joseph Overnay
- 1831: Le Watchman, drama in 3 acts and 6 tableaux, with Benjamin Antier and Overnay
- 1832: Marie-Rose, ou la Nuit de Noël, three-act drama, with Saint-Amand
- 1835: Chérubin, ou le Page de Napoléon, two-act comédie en vaudeville, with Adrien Delaville, Charles Desnoyer, Edmond de Biéville and Adrien Viguier
- 1836: Le Doyen de Killerine, two-act comédie en vaudeville after the novel by Abbé Prévost, with Overnay
- 1840: La Peur du tonnerre, vaudeville in 1 act, with Overnay
- 1850: Trois amours d'anglais, ballet-comique

== Bibliography ==
- Joseph Marie Quérard, Les supercheries littéraires dévoilées: Galerie des écrivains, vol.1, 1869, (p. 199)
