= Jeanne Arnould-Plessy =

French actress (1819–1897)

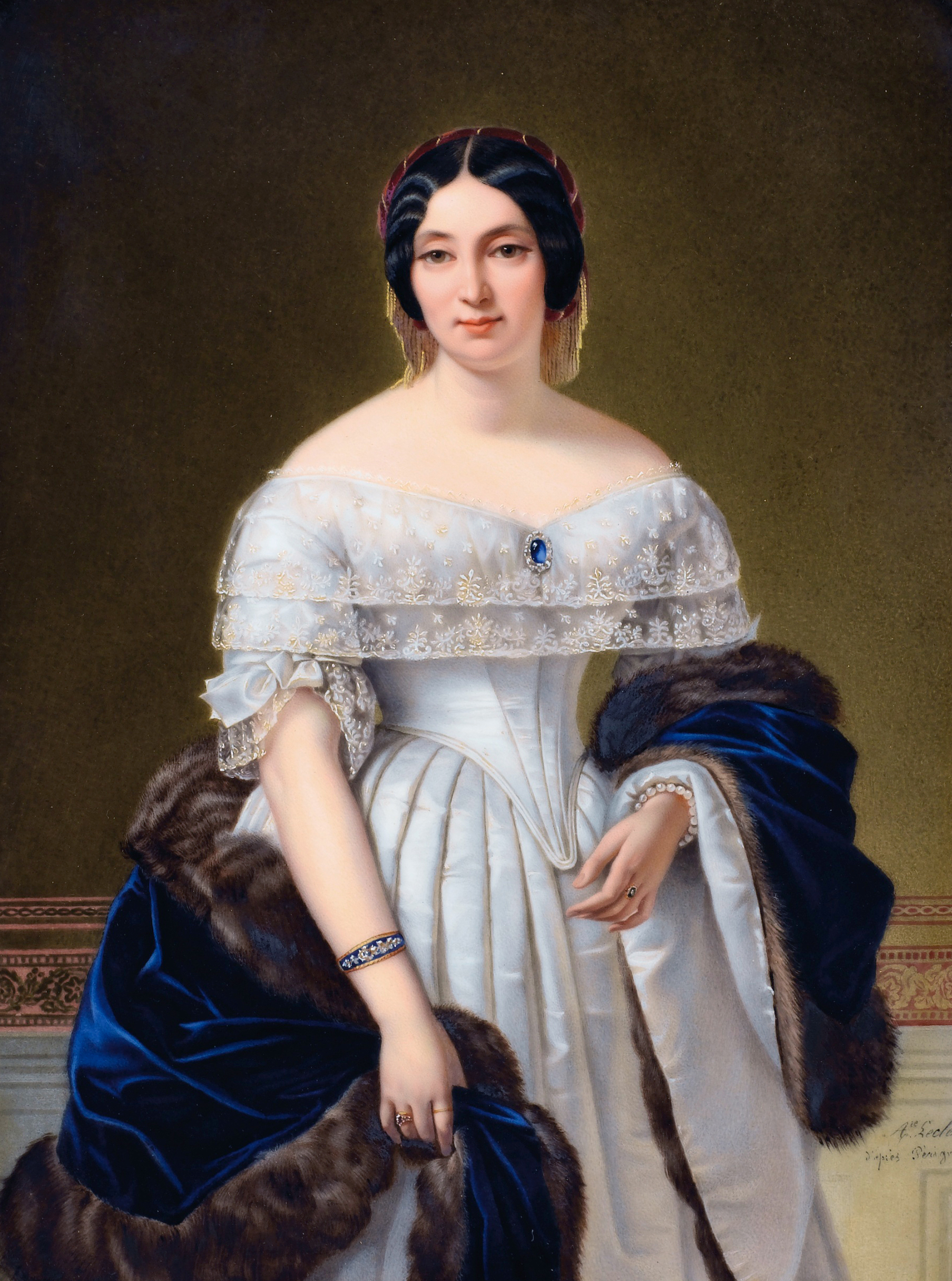
- Born: Jeanne-Sylvanie-Sophie Plessy; 4 September 1819
- Died: 30 May 1897 (aged 77)
- Occupation: Actress
- Years active: 1834–1876
- Known for: Comédie-Française
- Spouse: Auguste Arnould

Jeanne Arnould-Plessy (born Jeanne-Sylvanie-Sophie Plessy; 4 September 1819 – 30 May 1897) was a French stage actress.

== Life ==
Jeanne-Sylvanie-Sophie Plessy was born in Metz, France, the daughter of Philippe Plessy, a local actor. She became a pupil of Samson at the Conservatoire in 1829. Plessy made her stage debut as Emma at the Comédie-Française in 1834 in Alexandre Duval's La Fille d'honneur. She had an immense success, and Mlle Mars, to whom the public already compared her, took her up.

Until 1845, she had prominent parts in all the plays, new and old, at the Théâtre Français, when suddenly at the height of her success, she left Paris and went to London to marry the dramatic author Auguste Jean François Arnould (1803-1854), a man much older than herself. The Comédie-Française, after having tried in vain to bring her back, brought a suit against her and obtained damages.

In the meantime, Madame Arnould-Plessy accepted an engagement at the French theatre at St. Petersburg (Mikhaylovsky Theatre), where she played for nine years and was greatly appreciated by Nicholas I and the Russian aristocracy. In 1855, she returned to Paris and was re-admitted to the Comédie-Française, as pensionnaire in an engagement for eight years. This second part of her career was even more brilliant than the first. She revived some of her old roles, but her later triumphs were especially associated with new plays by Émile Augier, including Maître Guérin. Her last appearance was in Édouard Cadol's La Grand-maman; she retired in 1876, and died in 1897, aged 77.
