= Robert Macaire (character) =

Fictional character

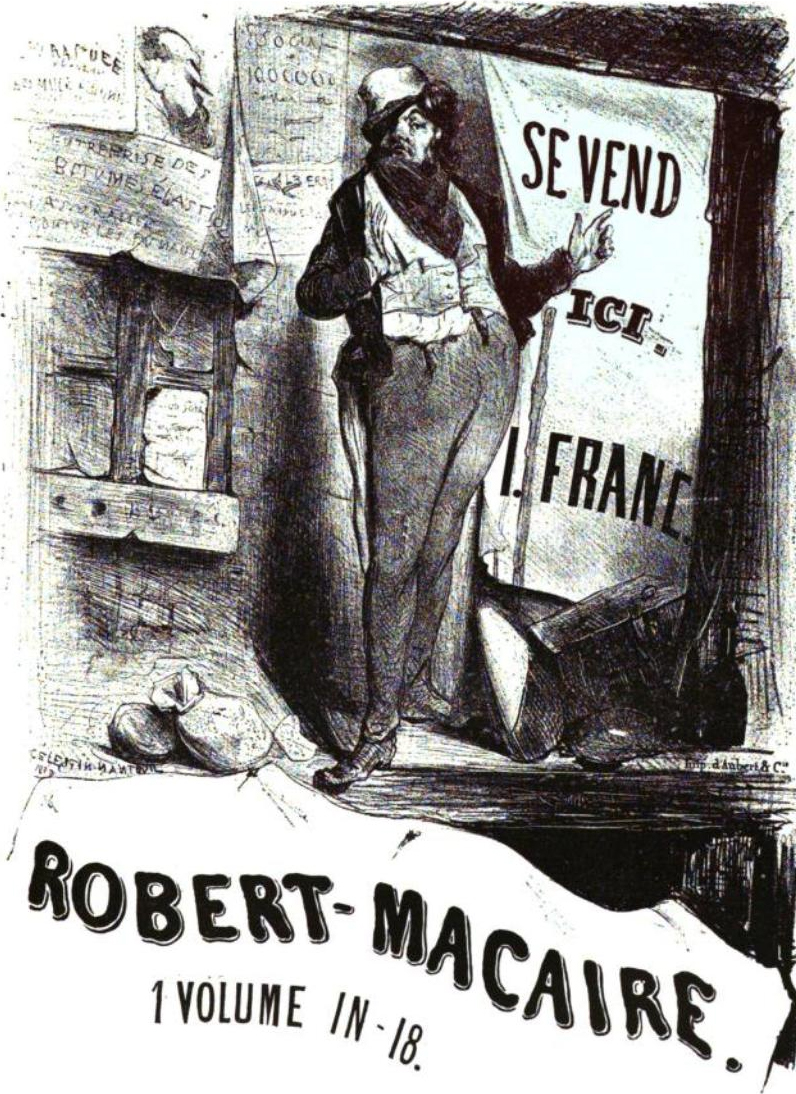
19th century illustration

Robert Macaire is a fictional character, an unscrupulous swindler, who appears in a number of French plays, films, and other works of art. In French culture he represents an archetypal villain. He was principally the creation of an actor, Frédérick Lemaître, who took the stock figure of "a ragged tramp, a common thief with tattered frock coat patched pants" and transformed him during his performances into "the dapper confidence man, the financial schemer, the juggler of joint-stock companies" that could serve to lampoon financial speculation and government corruption.

== Creation ==
Playwright Benjamin Antier (1787–1870), with two collaborators Saint-Amand and Polyanthe, created the character Robert Macaire in the play l'Auberge des Adrets, a serious-minded melodrama. After the work's failure at its 1823 premiere, Frédérick Lemaître played the role as a comic figure instead. Violating all the conventions of its genre, it became a comic success and ran for a hundred performances. The transformation violated social standards that demanded crime be treated with seriousness and expected criminals to be punished appropriately. The play was soon banned, and representations of the character of Macaire were banned time and again until the 1880s. Lemaître used the character again in a sequel he co-authored titled Robert Macaire, first presented in 1835.

The British author George William MacArthur Reynolds authored a penny dreadful entitled Robert Macaire; or, The French Bandit in England (1839).

The book Physiologie du Robert-Macaire (1842) written by Pierre-Joseph Rousseau (1797–1849) and illustrated by Honoré Daumier identified Macaire with a variety of contemporary social types, all involved in "shady schemes for instant wealth", and especially Émile de Girardin (1806–1881), a businessman who promoted his financial adventures through his own newspaper, La Presse. Daumier also published a series of a hundred lithographs of Macaire in Charivari between 1836 and 1842.

Edward Jakobowski based his comic opera Erminie on an English translation of the play Robert Macaire. It premiered in London in 1885. It had a considerable success. Its first New York production ran for 571 performances.

Two silent films used the character Macaire: Robert Macaire and Bertrand (1906) and The Adventures of Robert Macaire (1925).

The French film Les Enfants du Paradis (1945), set in the 1830s, presents Pierre Brasseur as Lemaître playing the role of Macaire.

La Robert-Macaire was the name of a popular dance, mentioned along with the cancan in an 1841 play.

French cuisine includes a vegetarian potato dish called pommes de terre Macaire.

== Earlier use of the name ==
Before Lemaître created his politically charged Macaire character, the name Robert Macaire was associated with a figure in a 14th-century legend who was required to engage in trial-by-combat with a dog. A melodrama called Le Chien de Montargis, ou la Forêt de Bondy premiered in Paris on 18 June 1814 and ran until 1834. It was translated into English and German. In an English-language compendium of oddities published in 1869, Macaire murders a man in the forest of Bondy on the outskirts of Paris. The only witness to survive is the victim's dog. King Charles V orders a trial by combat and the dog defeats Macaire, which leads to Macaire's conviction and hanging.
