= Adrien Viguier =

French writer, playwright, and literary critic

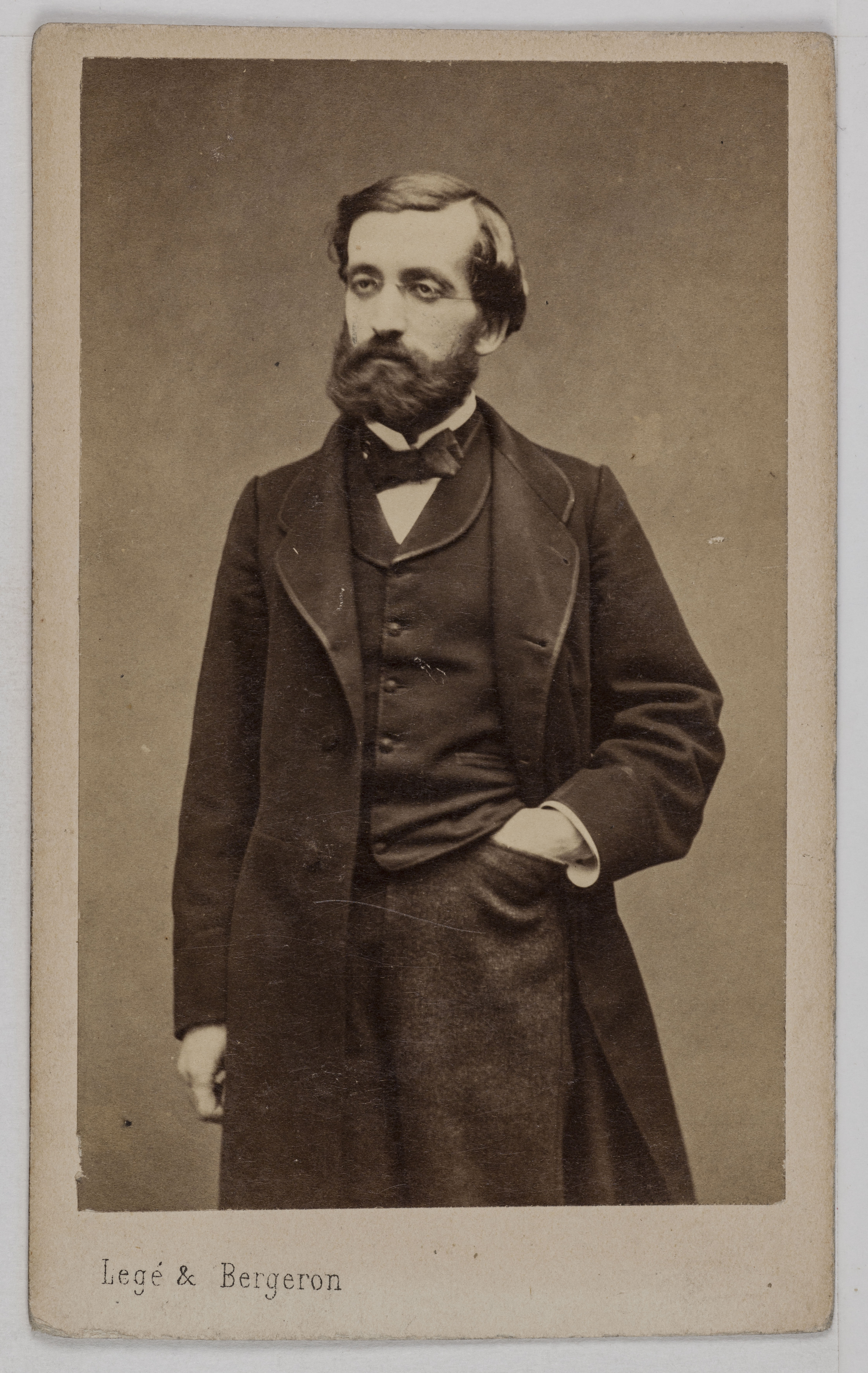
- Born: Joseph Étienne Adrien Viguier; 20 January 1805; Béziers, Hérault, France
- Died: 10 December 1884 (aged 79); Nice, France
- Occupations: Playwright, writer, literary critic

Adrien Viguier (born Joseph Étienne Adrien Viguier; 20 January 1805 – 10 December 1884), pen name Adrien Delaville, was a 19th-century French writer, playwright, and literary critic.

== Works ==
- 1825: Le Sacre de Charlemagne, Ladvocat
- 1838: Chérubin, ou le Page de Napoléon, comédie-vaudeville in 2 acts, by MM. Edmond de Biéville, Adrien Viguier, and Adrien Payn... Paris, Ambigu-comique, 10 October 1835, Marchant
- 1827: Traité de la traduction, ou L'art de traduire le latin en français, 23 p., Édition : Paris : Brunot-Labbe, Text online
- 1842: Roger, pseudonym Adrien Delaville
- 1844: Régine, Au Comptoir des imprimeurs-unis
- 1844: Le Dernier des touristes, humour, by Adrien Delaville, H. Souverain
- 1845: Les Deux César, comédie-vaudeville en un acte, by M. Arvers... [Paris, Gymnase-Dramatique, 17 February 1845.]; In-4° à 2 col., 19 p.Description : Note : Rédigé avec la collaboration d'Adrien Viguier, after Vapereau. - Répertoire dramatique des auteurs contemporains, 286; Édition : Paris : l'Éditeur du Répertoire dramatique et Tresse, 1845; Auteur du texte : Félix Arvers (1806-1850)
- 1844: Épopée, In-12, 172 p., Note : Ce titre figure dans la liste des œuvres d'A. Viguier en tête de son roman : "Roger", avec la mention : "roman de la Révolution de juillet"; Édition : Paris : au Comptoir des éditeurs réunis
- 1849: Love. Débuts. 2e édition, Comon
- 1851: Aperçus littéraires, by Adrien Delaville, Comptoir des imprimeurs-unis
- 1863: Armelle, ou La pauvre villageoise, pseudonym Adrien Delaville
- 1870: La légende de Jeanne d'Arc, In-18, XXVIII-211 p., Description : Note : Reçu à correction au Théâtre-français; Édition : Paris : E. Dentu
- 1876: Napoleo epicus,2 vol. in-18; Description : Note : Par A. Viguier, d'après sa dédicace ms. sur le deuxième ex. - La préface est datée de 1874; Édition : Paris : Vanier
