= Eugène Roche =

French playwright

Eugène Honoré Roche (30 April 1808, in Paris – 12 June 1870, in Paris) was a French playwright of the 19th century. His plays were presented on the most prestigious Parisian stages of his time: Théâtre des Variétés, Théâtre des Folies-Dramatiques, Théâtre du Vaudeville, etc.

== Works ==
- 1829: Le Nouveau ministère, drama in 4 historical tableaux and in verses, with Duflot
- 1830: Le Bal de l'avoué, ou les Quadrilles historiques, comédie en vaudevilles in 2 acts, with Duflot
- 1830: La Mariée à l'encan, ou le Gentil faucheur, tableau villageois in 1 act, with Duflot and Emmanuel Théaulon
- 1830: Les Trois couchées, ou l'Amour en poste, comédie en vaudevilles in 3 acts
- 1832: Les Appartements à louer, comédie en vaudevilles in 1 act and in 5 tableaux, with Joachim Duflot
- 1833: Poète et maçon, comédie en vaudevilles in 1 act, with Antonin d'Avrecourt and de Leuven
- 1834: L'alcôve, comédie en vaudevilles, with Adolphe de Leuven and de Forges
- 1835: Esther à Saint-Cyr, comédie en vaudevilles in 1 act, with de Leuven and de Forges
- 1836: Madame Péterhoff, vaudeville-anecdote in 1 act, with Charles de Livry
- 1836: Georgine, ou la Servante du pasteur, comedy in 1 act, mingled with singing, with de Forges
- 1836: Une spéculation, Comédie en vaudevilles in 1 act, with Dumanoir
- 1838: Le Tireur de cartes, comédie en vaudevilles in 1 act, with Alexis Decomberousse
- 1839: Les Maris vengés, comédie en vaudevilles in 5 acts, with Étienne Arago and Decomberousse
- 1840: Le Chevalier Kerkaradeck, comédie en vaudevilles in 1 act, with Max Revel
- 1840: La Grisette de Bordeaux, comédie en vaudevilles in 1 act, with Decomberousse
- 1846: L'Homme qui se cherche, comédie en vaudevilles in 1 act, with Decomberousse
- 1847: Qui dort dîne, comédie en vaudevilles in 1 act, with Étienne Casimir Hippolyte Cordellier-Delanoue
- 1849: La chute des feuilles, ou L'appétit vient en mangeant, proverbe in 1 act, with Auguste Pittaud de Forges
- 1852: A qui mal veut, mal arrive, vaudeville proverbe in 1 act
- 1855: Nous en ferons un avocat, comédie en vaudevilles in 1 act, with Abel Lahure
- 1859: L'Homme qui a bu, comédie en vaudevilles in 1 act, with Henri Avocat

== Bibliography ==
- Joseph Marie Quérard, La France littéraire ou dictionnaire bibliographique des savants..., vol. 12, 1864, pp. 617–19
