= Henri Horace Meyer =

French dramatist and novelist

- Born: 17 May 1801; Brussels
- Died: 2 February 1870 (aged 68); Paris, France
- Occupations: Playwright, novelist

Henri Horace Meyer (17 May 1801 – 2 February 1870) was a 19th-century French dramatist and novelist.

Managing director of the Théâtre de la Gaîté from 1839 to 1847, his plays were presented on the most important Parisian stages of his time including the Théâtre du Gymnase-Dramatique, the Théâtre de l'Ambigu-Comique, and the Théâtre de la Gaîté.

In 1839, he witnessed the attack on 12 and 13 May.

== Works ==
- 1834: Le Doigt de Dieu, drama in 1 act
- 1836: Amazampo, ou la Découverte du quinquina, drama in 4 acts and 7 tableaux
- 1836: L'Empereur et le soldat, ou le 5 mai 1821, souvenirs contemporains
- 1837: La fille d'un militaire, comédie-vaudeville in 2 acts, with Laurencin
- 1837: Richard Moor, drama in 4 acts, preceded by Une heure trop tard, prologue in 1 act
- 1838: Samuel le marchand, drama in 5 acts, with Louis Gabriel Montigny
- 1838: Candinot, roi de Rouen, vaudeville in 2 acts, with Hugues Bouffé, Charles-Hippolyte Dubois-Davesnes and Eugène Moreau
- 1839: Le Sylphe d'or, pièce fantastique in 3 acts, preceded by a prologue, with Montigny
- 1840: La Famille Dulaure, drame-vaudeville in 1 act
- 1840: Un moment d'ambition, ou Plus de peur que de mal, comédie-vaudeville in 1 act
- 1844: Le Mannequin du prince, drame-vaudeville in 3 acts, with Benjamin Antier
- 1850: Le sac à malices, féerie in 3 acts and 25 tableaux
- 1854: Harry-le-Diable, historical drama in 3 acts, with Narcisse Fournier
- 1854: La Partie de piquet, comédie-vaudeville in 1 act, with Fournier
- 1855: Jocelin le garde-côte, drama in 5 acts, with Fournier
- 1855: Le Mal de la peur, comedy in 1 act
- 1855: Penicaut le somnambule, comédie-vaudeville in 1 act, with Fournier
- 1857: Le Beau-père, comedy in 1 act
- 1858: M. Candaule, ou le Roi des maris, comédie-vaudeville in 1 act, with Fournier
- 1860: Le Chef de la Bande Noire, novel
- 1860: Une voix du ciel, comedy in 1 act, with Fournier
- 1861: Les Traboucayres, ou les chauffeurs de la montagne, drama in 5 acts and 9 tableaux, with Fournier
- 1861: Chassé-croisé, comedy in 1 act, with Fournier
- 1861: La Fille de l'armurier ou les Pays-Bas en 1482, novel
- 1862: Le portefeuille rouge, drama in 5 acts with a prologue, with Fournier
- 1863: Le Père Lefeutre, comédie-vaudeville in 4 acts, with Fournier
- 1863: Les ruines du château noir, drama in 9 tableaux, including a prologue, with Fournier
- 1865: Le Supplice de Paniquet, comedy in 1 act, with Fournier and Gustave Bondon
- 1876: Les Dumacheff, ou le Cocher fidèle, parodie de la pièce de l'Odéon : Les Danicheff, in 1 act and 2 tableaux, with Émile Desbeaux, posth.
