= Henri Franconi =

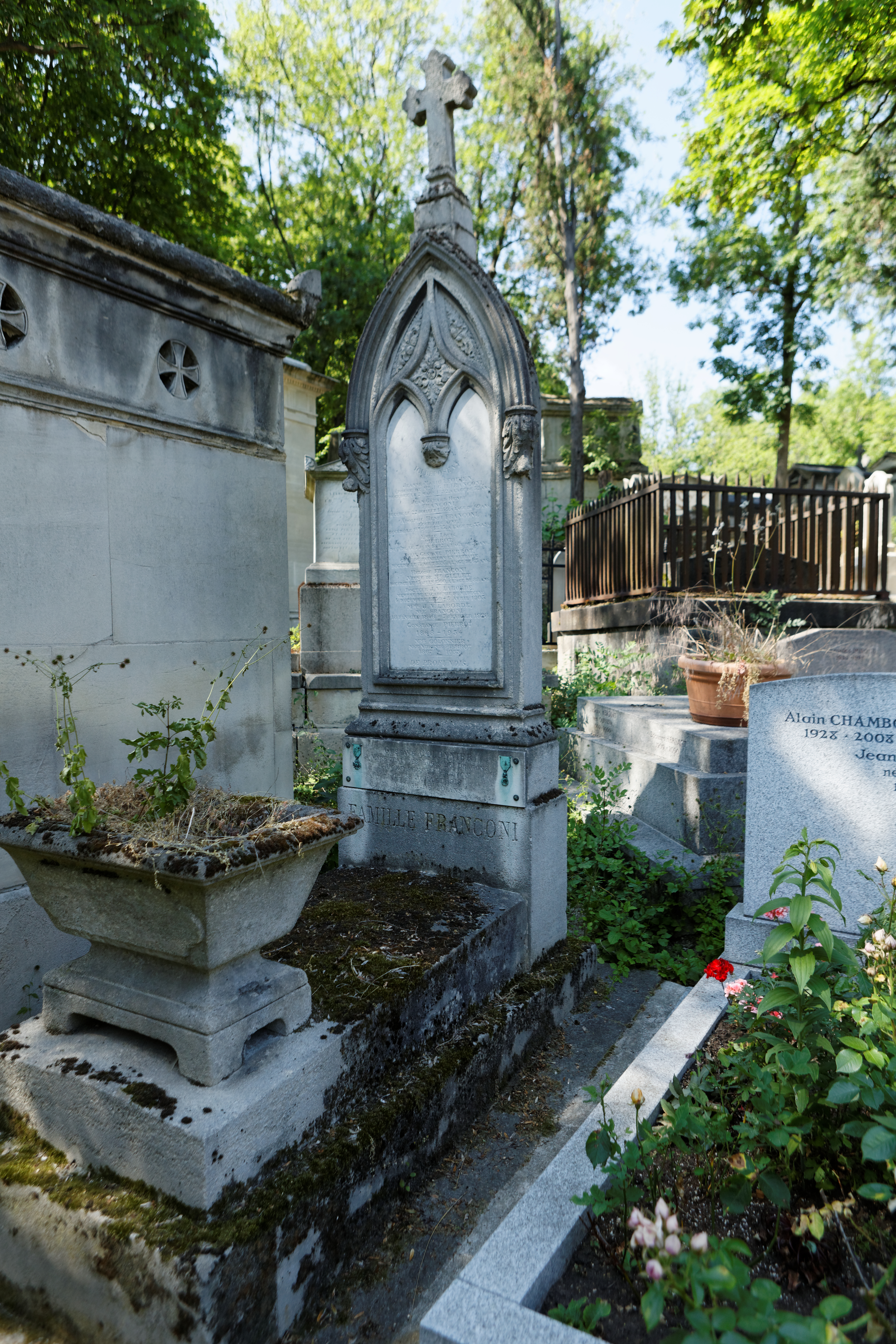
- Henri Franconi's grave at the Père Lachaise Cemetery (35th division)
- Born: 4 November 1779; Lyon, France
- Died: 22 July 1849 (aged 69); Paris, France
- Occupations: Playwright, circus performer

Henri Franconi, full name Jean Gérard Henri Franconi, (4 November 1779 – 22 July 1849) was a French playwright and circus performer of the early 19th century.

A son of Antonio Franconi, in 1807 he became with his brother Laurent director of the Cirque-Olympique (1807-1837). An actor, a mime, an esquire, nicknamed Minette, he authored pantomimes, dramas and vaudeville.

== Works ==
- 1808: Les Quatre fils Aymons, equestrian scenes in 2 parts
- 1808: Cavalo-Dios, ou le Cheval génie bienfaisant, equestrian scenes, mingled with féeries, in 2 parts, with Cuvelier
- 1808: Barberousse le Balafré, ou les Valaques, equestrian and chivalrous scenes, in 2 parts, extravaganza, with Jean-Guillaume-Antoine Cuvelier
- 1808: Fra Diavolo, ou le Frère diable, chef de bandits dans les Alpes, equestrian scenes in 2 parts, with Cuvelier
- 1808: La Prise de la Corogne, ou les Anglais en Espagne, equestrian scenes
- 1810: Les chevaux vengés, ou Parodie de la parodie de Fernand Cortez
- 1810: Gérard de Nevers et la Belle Euriant, chivalrous and equestrians pantomime scens, with Cuvelier
- 1810: Le Passage du pont de Lodi, memorable action in 1 part
- 1811: Don Quichotte et Sancho Pança, folie in two tableaux, extravaganza, with Cuvelier
- 1811: Les Ermites blancs, ou l'Ile de Caprée, tableaux pantomimes in 2 actions
- 1811: Le Jugement suprême, ou l'Innocence sauvée, tableaux in 3 actions, with Nicolas Brazier and Cuvelier
- 1812: Frédégonde et Brunehaut
- 1812: Geneviève ou La confiance trahie, pantomime in 3 acts
- 1812: La mine Beaujonc ou Le dévouement sublime
- 1812: La Famille d'Armincourt, ou les Voleurs, tableaux by Boilly set in action, pantomime in 2 acts, with Jean-Baptiste-Louis Camel
- 1812: Frédégonde et Brunehaut, historical pantomime in 3 acts after the historical novel by Jacques Marie Boutet
- 1812: Maria ou le Mauvais fils, pantomime in 3 acts
- 1812: Les Trois aigles ou les Mariages lithuaniens, historical and military pantomime, with Cuvelier
- 1813: Arsène, ou le Génie maure, pantomime in 3 acts, extravaganza with machines
- 1813: Guliver ou la Manie des voyages, pantomime folie in 3 acts
- 1813: La Dame du lac, ou l'Inconnu, pantomime in 3 acts, extravaganza
- 1814: L'Entrée de Henri IV à Paris, historical tableau, in 2 acts, with Cuvelier
- 1814: Le Maréchal de Villars, ou la Bataille de Denain, historical and military action
- 1814: La Mort du capitaine Cook, ou les Insulaires d'O-Why-E, pantomime in 2 acts, extravaganza
- 1815: Diane et les satyres ! ou Une vengeance de l'Amour, pantomime in 2 acts, with 1 prologue
- 1815: Orsino, pantomime with dialogue in 3 acts
- 1815: Robert-le-Diable, ou le Criminel repentant, pantomime in 3 acts, extravaganza
- 1815: La mine Beaujonc ou le Dévouement sublime, historical fact in 2 acts
- 1816: Sancho dans l'île de Barataria, pantomime bouffonne in 2 acts, with 1 prologue, with Cuvelier
- 1817: Caïn, ou le Premier crime, pantomime in 3 acts, after the poem by Gessner
- 1818: La ferme des carrières, fait historique, pantomime in 2 acts, mingled with dialogue, with Pierre Villiers
- 1819: Poniatowski, ou le Passage de l'Elster, military drama in 3 acts, with Villiers
- 1819: Le Soldat laboureur, mimodrame in 1 act
- 1820: Le Cuirassier, ou la Bravoure récompensée, mimo-drame en 1 act
- 1820: Fayel et Gabrielle de Vergy, with Pierre Blanchard
- 1820: L'Hospitalité, ou la Chaumière hongroise, military anecdote in 1 act, extravaganza, with Pierre Carmouche
- 1821: La Bataille de Bouvines, mimodrame in 3 acts
- 1821: Le Soldat fermier, ou le Bon seigneur, mimodrama in 1 act, extravaganza, a sequel to Soldat laboureur
- 1823: Le Pâtre, melodrama in 2 acts
- 1823: La Lettre anonyme, comedy in 1 act and in prose, with Charles-Maurice Descombes
- 1824: Le 27 septembre 1824, vaudeville in 1 act and extravaganza, with Amable de Saint-Hilaire
- 1824: Le Pont de Logrono, ou le Petit tambour, suivi de la Prise du Trocadero, historical and military action in 3 parts, with Cuvelier
- 1825: Le Chien du régiment, ou l'Exécution militaire, melodrama in 1 act, with Saint-Léon and Adolphe Franconi
- 1825: L'Incendie de Salins, melodrama in 1 act, extravaganza, with Saint-Léon
- 1825: Le Vieillard ou La Révélation, melodrama in 2 acts, with Alexandre-Joseph Le Roy de Bacre
- 1825: Les Recruteurs, ou la Fille du fermier, play in 2 acts, extravaganza, with Carmouche and Henri de Saint-Georges
- 1830: Youli, ou les Souliotes, melodrama in 2 acts and 5 tableaux, with Théodore Nézel
