= Benjamin Antier =

French playwright (1787–1870)

- Born: Benjamin Chevrillon; 21 March 1787; Paris, France
- Died: 25 April 1870 (aged 83); Paris, France
- Occupation: Playwright

Benjamin Antier, real name Benjamin Chevrillon, (21 March 1787 – 25 April 1870), was a 19th-century French playwright.

An author of melodramas and vaudevilles written in collaboration with other dramatists, he is mostly known for his drama L'Auberge des Adrets, premiered in 1823. The play featured the villain Robert Macaire, played on stage by Frédérick Lemaître, who, in 1835, wrote with Antier a second play called Robert Macaire. The character was then popularized by Daumier's caricatures to become, after James Rousseau's word in his Physiologie du Robert Macaire, "the embodiment of our positive, selfish, greedy, liar, boastful era... basically blagueuse. In 1945, L'Auberge des Adrets would be the basis of Marcel Carné's film, Children of Paradise, with Jean-Louis Barrault and Arletty.

Most of his plays were signed "Benjamin", as it was then customary for melodrama writers and actors to make them known by their first names. He was made chevalier de la Légion d'honneur in 1864.

== Theatre ==
- Haguenier ou l'Habit de cour, vaudeville in 1 act, with Pierre-Jean de Béranger and Ludwig Benedict Franz von Bilderbeck, Paris, Théâtre de la Porte-Saint-Martin, 10 July 1818.
- M. Duquignon, comedy in 1 act, mingled with couplets, with Frédéric Dupetit-Méré, Paris, Théâtre de la Porte-Saint-Martin, 16 January 1821.
- Frank, ou l'Homme de la montagne, drama in 3 acts and in prose, with Rigaud (the young), Paris, Théâtre de la Porte-Saint-Martin, 20 December 1821.
- La Pauvre Famille, melodrama in 3 acts, with Melchior Boisset, Paris, Théâtre de l'Ambigu-Comique, 9 November 1822.
- Elfride ou la Vengeance, melodrama in 3 acts, with Martin Deslandes, Théâtre de la Porte-Saint-Martin, 28 December 1822.
- La Lanterne sourde, ou les Deux porte-faix, vaudeville-féerie in 1 act, with Marc-Antoine Désaugiers, Paris, Théâtre des Nouveautés, 20 March 1823.
- L'Auberge des Adrets, drama in 3 acts and extravaganza, with Saint-Amand and Polyanthe, Paris, Théâtre de l'Ambigu-Comique, 2 July 1823 Text online.
- Le Quartier du Temple, ou Mon ami Beausoleil, pièce grivoise in 1 act, mingled with vaudevilles, with Louis Ponet, Paris, Théâtre de l'Ambigu-Comique, 13 August 1823.
- La Maison de plaisance, vaudeville in 1 act, with Pierre-Jean de Béranger and Jean-Baptiste-Rose-Bonaventure Violet d'Épagny, Paris, Théâtre du Vaudeville, 8 October 1823.
- Attila et le Troubadour, comédie-vaudeville in 1 act, with Pierre-Jean de Béranger and Ludwig Benedict Franz von Bilderbeck, Paris, Théâtre du Vaudeville, 7 February 1824.
- Le Grenier du poète, vaudeville in 1 act, with Louis Portelette, Paris, Théâtre de l'Ambigu-Comique, 13 May 1824.
- Les Femmes, ou le Mérite des femmes, comedy in 2 acts, with Pierre-Jean de Béranger, Paris, Théâtre de la Gaité, 20 April 1824.
- Le Garçon de noce, vaudeville in 1 act, with Charles Mourier, Paris, Théâtre de l'Ambigu-Comique, 24 November 1824.
- Les Deux Écots, à propos vaudeville in 1 act, with Melchior Boisset, Paris, Théâtre de l'Ambigu-Comique, 22 January 1825.
- Albert, ou le Rêve et le réveil, melodrama in 3 acts, with Melchior Boisset, Paris, Théâtre de l'Ambigu-Comique, 25 January 1825.
- Le Point d'honneur, vaudeville in 1 act from Contes by Adrien de Sarrasin, with Gabriel-Alexandre Belle, Paris, Théâtre du Vaudeville, 8 August 1825.
- Le Cocher de fiacre, melodrama in 3 acts, with Alexis Decomberousse and Naigeon, Paris, Théâtre de l'Ambigu-Comique, 25 August 1825.
- Gustave, ou le Napolitain, melodrama in 3 acts, with Auguste Anicet-Bourgeois, Paris, Théâtre de la Gaîté, 4 October 1825.
- Le Nouvelliste, ou le Plan de campagne, comédie-vaudeville in 1 act, with Félix de Croisy and Martin Deslandes, Théâtre de la Porte-Saint-Martin, 2 July 1826.
- Le Pauvre de l'Hôtel-Dieu, melodrama in 3 acts, with Alexis Decomberousse and Naigeon, Paris, Théâtre de la Gaîté, 16 août 1826.
- La Liquidation, comédie-vaudeville in 1 act and in prose, with Armand Séville and Louis Ponet, Paris, Théâtre du Vaudeville, 17 November 1826.
- Le Garçon de recette, ou la Rente, comedy in 1 act, mingled with couplets, with Édouard Damarin, Paris, Théâtre de l'Ambigu-Comique, 12 December 1826.
- Poulailler, melodrama in 9 little acts, with Théodore Nézel, Paris, Théâtre de la Gaîté, 21 February 1827.
- Mandrin, melodrama in 3 acts, with Étienne Arago and Edmond Crosnier, Paris, Théâtre de la Porte-Saint-Martin, 3 April 1827.
- Antonia, ou Milan et Grenoble, melodrama in 3 days, with Naigeon, Paris, Théâtre de la Gaîté, 13 Septembre 1827.
- La Muette de la forêt, melodrama in 1 act, from the novel Sœur Anne, with René Charles Guilbert de Pixérécourt, Paris, Théâtre de la Gaîté, 29 January 1828.
- Le Chasseur noir, melodrama in 3 acts extravaganza, with Frédérick Lemaître and Théodore Nézel, Paris, Théâtre de la Porte-Saint-Martin, 30 January 1828.
- Guillaume Tell, melodrama in 6 parts, imitated from Schiller, with Pixérécourt, Paris, Théâtre de la Gaîté, 3 May 1829 Text online.
- Bisson, melodrama in 2 acts and 5 parts, extravaganza, with Théodore Nézel and Henry Villemot, Paris, Cirque olympique, 13 Juin 1828.
- Le Remplaçant, melodrama in 3 acts, with Saint-Amand and Henri Villemot, Paris, Théâtre de l'Ambigu-Comique, 26 June 1828.
- Les Lanciers et les marchandes de modes, one-act play, mingled with couplets, with Armand Joseph Overnay, Théodore Nézel and E. F. Varez, Paris, Théâtre de la Gaîté, 3 November 1828.
- Bugg, ou les Javanais, melodrama in 3 acts, with Félix de Croisy and marquis de Flers Hyacinthe-Jacques de La Motte-Ango, Paris, Théâtre de l'Ambigu-Comique, 18 September 1828.
- Rochester, drama in 3 acts and 6 parts, with Théodore Nézel, Paris, Théâtre de la Porte-Saint-Martin, 17 January 1829.
- Le Jeune Médecin, comedy in 1 act, with Auguste Anicet-Bourgeois, Paris, Théâtre de l'Ambigu-Comique, 3 September 1829.
- Isaure, drama in 3 acts, mingled with songs, with Francis Cornu and Théodore Nézel, Paris, Théâtre des Nouveautés, 1 October 1829.
- L'Enragée de Chaumont, comedy in 1 act, with Antoine Simonnin, Paris, Théâtre de la Porte-Saint-Martin, 2 November 1829.
- Le Fils de Louison, melodrama in 3 acts, with Alexis Decomberousse, Paris, Théâtre de la Gaîté, 19 December 1829.
- Les Massacres, fièvre cérébrale in 3 acts and in sacred verses, preceded by : Le Diable au spectacle, prologue with Théodore Nézel and Antoine Simonnin, Paris, Théâtre de la Gaîté, 19 June 1830.
- Jeffries, ou le Grand Juge, melodrama in 3 acts, with Ludwig Benedict Franz von Bilderbeck, Paris, Théâtre de la Gaîté, 14 July 1830.
- Napoléon en paradis, vaudeville in 1 act, with Théodore Nézel and Antoine Simonnin, Paris, Théâtre de la Gaîté, 17 November 1830.
- Le Pâtissier usurpateur, historical play in 5 little acts, with Théodore Nézel and Antoine Simonnin, Paris, Théâtre de la Gaîté, 4 December 1830.
- Benjamin Constant aux Champs-Elisées, tableau in 1 act mingled with couplets, with Victor Lottin de Laval and Édouard Damarin, Paris, Théâtre de l'Ambigu-Comique, 8 January 1831.
- Joachim Murat, historical drama in 4 acts and 9 tableaux, with Alexis Decomberousse and Théodore Nézel, Paris, Théâtre de l'Ambigu-Comique, 12 February 1831.
- L'Incendiaire, ou le Curé et l'archevêché, drama in 3 acts extravaganza, with Alexis Decomberousse, Paris, Théâtre de la Porte-Saint-Martin, 24 March 1831.
- Mademoiselle de La Vallière et Madame de Montespan, historical drama in 3 acts, followed by Épilogue ou Dix-huit ans après, with Lagrange, Paris, Théâtre de l'Ambigu-Comique, 21 May 1831.
- L'Irlandais, ou l'Esprit national, comédie-vaudeville in 2 acts, translated from English, with Eugène Scribe, Paris, Gymnase dramatique, 6 September 1831.
- Le Watchman, drama in 3 acts and 6 tableaux, with Armand Joseph Overnay and Adrien Payn, Paris, Théâtre de l'Ambigu-Comique, 16 September 1831.
- Les Six degrés du crime, melodrama in 3 acts, with Théodore Nézel, Paris, Théâtre de l'Ambigu-Comique, 30 November 1831.
- L'Abolition de la peine de mort, drama in 3 acts and in 6 tableaux, with Alexis Decomberousse and J.-S. Raffard-Brienne, Paris, Théâtre de l'Ambigu-Comique, 22 Fevrier 1832.
- Le Suicide d'une jeune fille, drama in 3 acts, imitated from the German, with Alexis Decomberousse and Théodore Nézel, Paris, Théâtre du Panthéon, 19 June 1832.
- Le Te-Deum et le De Profundis, vaudeville in 1 act, with Victor Ratier, Paris, Théâtre du Panthéon, 13 December 1832.
- Le Cinquième acte drame-vaudeville in 3 acts, with Hyacinthe-Jacques de La Motte-Ango de Flers, Paris, Théâtre de l'Ambigu-Comique, 9 February 1833.
- La Salle de bains, vaudeville in 2 acts, with Alexis Decomberousse, Paris, Théâtre des Variétés, 21 August 1833.
- Aimer et mourir, drama in 3 acts, with Alexis Decomberousse, Paris, Théâtre de l'Ambigu-Comique, 19 November 1833.
- Le Capitaine de vaisseau, ou la Salamandre, vaudeville nautique in 2 acts, with Alexis Decomberousse and Mélesville, Paris, Gymnase-dramatique, 24 July 1834.
- Les Tours de Notre-Dame. Anecdote du temps de Charles VII, with Alexis Decomberousse, Paris, Théâtre des Variétés, 3 November 1834.
- Les Beignets à la Cour, comedy in 2 acts mingled with songs, with Hyacinthe-Jacques de La Motte-Ango de Flers, Paris, Théâtre du Palais-Royal, 25 March 1835.
- Robert Macaire, play in 4 acts and 6 tableaux, with Saint-Amand and Frédérick Lemaître, Paris, Théâtre de la Porte-Saint-Martin, September 1835.
- Héloïse et Abeilard, drama in 5 acts, with Auguste Anicet Bourgeois and Francis Cornu, Paris, Théâtre de l'Ambigu-Comique, 26 March 1836.
- L'Homme des rochers, ou les Islandais, melodrama in 3 acts, extravaganza, with Edmond Rochefort, Paris, Théâtre de la Gaîté, 14 May 1836.
- La Reine d'un jour, chronique mauresque in 2 acts, mingled with songs, with Alexis Decomberousse, Paris, Théâtre de l'Ambigu-Comique, 16 May 1836.
- Le Colleur, comédie-vaudeville in 1 act, with Alexis Decomberousse, Paris, Théâtre du Palais-Royal, 20 August 1836.
- Pierre-le-Rouge, comedy in 3 acts, mingled with song, with Charles Dupeuty and Michel-Nicolas Balisson de Rougemont, Paris, Théâtre du Vaudeville, 12 October 1836.
- À quoi ça tient !, with Ernest Antier and Eugène Sandrin, comédie-vaudeville in 1 act, Paris, Théâtre du Palais-Royal, 23 July 1837.
- L'Agrafe, drama in 3 acts, with Ernest Antier, Paris, Théâtre de l'Ambigu-Comique, 31 July 1837.
- Plock le pêcheur, vaudeville in 1 act, with Louis Couailhac, Paris, Théâtre du Palais-Royal, 1 August 1838.
- Les Chiens du Mont Saint-Bernard, melodrama in 5 acts, with Hyacinthe-Jacques de La Motte-Ango de Flers, Paris, Théâtre de l'Ambigu-Comique, 24 August 1838.
- Le Marché de Saint-Pierre, melodrama in 5 acts, with Alexis Decomberousse, Paris, Théâtre de la Gaîté, 20 July 1839.
- Les Héritiers du comte, comédie-vaudeville in 3 acts, with Louis Couailhac, Paris, Théâtre de la Porte Saint-Antoine, 12 October 1839.
- Les Trois Muletiers, comical melodrama in 3 acts, with Marchal, Paris, Théâtre de la Porte-Saint-Martin, 9 November 1839.
- Un Bal aux Vendanges de Bourgogne, folie-vaudeville in 2 acts, with Louis Couailhac, Paris, Théâtre de la Porte-Saint-Antoine, 24 February 1840.
- L'Honneur d'une femme, drama in 3 acts, with Alexis Decomberousse, Paris, Théâtre de l'Ambigu-Comique, 14 June 1840.
- Les Filets de Saint-Cloud, drama in 5 acts, with Alexis Decomberousse, Paris, Théâtre de la Gaîté, 17 February 1842.
- Les voilà bien tous ! vaudeville in 1 act, with Hyacinthe-Jacques de La Motte-Ango de Flers, Paris, Théâtre de la Gaîté, 6 November 1844.
- Le Mannequin du prince, drame-vaudeville in 3 acts, with Henri Meyer and Jean-Baptiste-Rose-Bonaventure Violet d'Épagny, Paris, Théâtre de la Gaîté, 11 December 1844.
- La Carotte d'or, comédie-vaudeville in 1 act, with Alexis Decomberousse and Mélesville, Paris, Théâtre des Variétés, 2 June 1846.
- Le Masque de poix, drama in 5 acts and 8 tableaux from a book by M. Mocquard titled Les Fastes du crime, Paris, Théâtre de la Gaîté, 27 January 1855.
- Mon gigot et mon gendre, vaudeville in 2 acts, with Marchal, Paris, Folies-Dramatiques, 19 September 1861.
