= Lockroy =

French actor and playwright

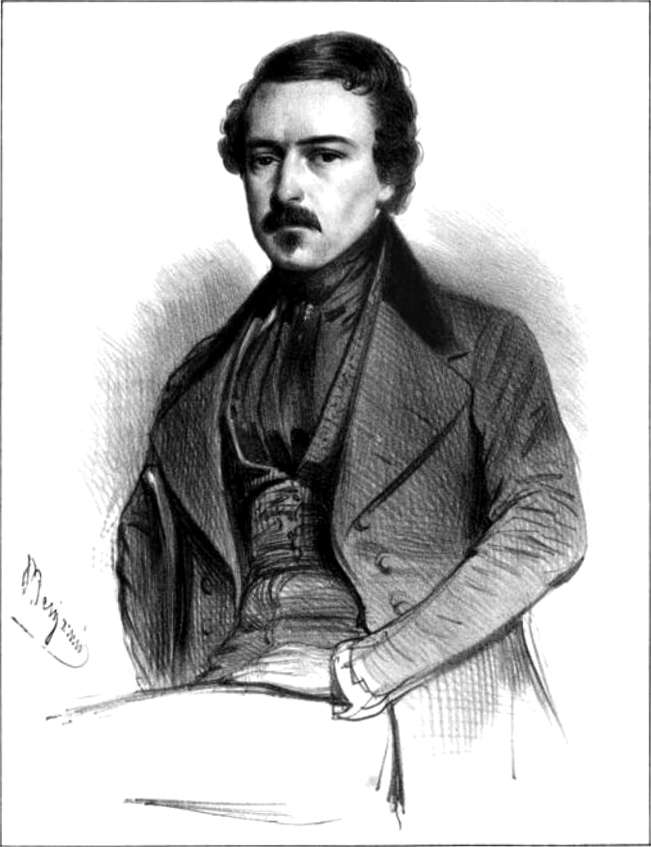
Lockroy, c. 1840

Joseph-Philippe Simon, called Lockroy (February 17, 1803 – January 19, 1891) was a French actor and playwright.

== Life ==
Born in Turin as the son of Baron General Henri Simon, who forbade his son's use of his surname in an artistic career, Joseph-Philippe Simon began as an actor under the pseudonym Lockroy at the Odéon-Théâtre de l'Europe and the Comédie-Française in Paris before devoting himself entirely to writing. For a few months in 1848 he served as provisional administrator of the Comédie-Française.

Lockroy married Antoinette Stephanie, the daughter of the revolutionary writer Marc-Antoine Jullien de Paris. She published two books of her own, Contes à mes nièces (Tales for my nieces, 1868) and Les Fées de la famille (Household fairies, 1886). Their son was the journalist and politician Édouard Lockroy.

Lockroy died in Paris.

== Works ==
- Un mariage corse, a vaudeville comedy in one act by Narcisse Fournier, Lockroy and Auguste Arnould, at the Théâtre de la Porte Saint-Martin, premiered May 26, 1832
- Passé minuit, a vaudeville comedy in one act, by Lockroy and Auguste Anicet-Bourgeois, 1839. Incidental music was added in 1868 by Louis Deffès for the Théâtre des Bouffes-Parisiens
- Les amours de Faublas, a pantomime ballet in three acts and four tables, choreography Emmanuel Théaulon, Théâtre de la Porte Saint-Martin, June 12, 1835
- Irène, a vaudeville comedy in two acts by Eugène Scribe and Lockroy, February 2, 1847
- Les dragons de Villars, an opéra comique by Eugène Cormon and Lockroy, with music by Aimé Maillart, 1856
- La reine Topaze, an opéra comique by Lockroy and Léon Battu, with music by Victor Massé, December 1856,
- Mon ami Pierrot, an opérette with music by Léo Delibes, July 1862
