= Auguste Le Poitevin de L'Égreville =

Auguste Le Poitevin de L’Égreville or Saint-Alme, (Paris, 1791 – Paris, 31 August 1854) was a 19th-century French homme de lettres and playwright.

The son of the actor known under the name de Resicourt, he made his literary debut in 1821 with two novels, Charles Pointel, ou Mon Cousin de la main gauche, 4 vol. in-12, and les Deux Hector, ou les Deux Familles bretonnes, 2 vol. in-12, which obtained a mediocre success. They were followed by l’Héritière de Birague, 1822, 4 vol. in-12; l’Anonyme ou Ni père ni mère, Paris, 1823, 3 vol. in-12, and Michel et Christine and la Suite, same date, 3 vol. in-12, which were quite well received. In 1824, in collaboration with Balzac, he published Jean-Louis, ou la Fille trouvée, 4 vol. in-12.

Le Poitevin, who also took an active part in the edition of small newspapers, often borrowed anonymity and hid under the names Viellerglé (anagram of Légreville), Prosper and Saint-Alme.

Auguste Le Poitevin a.k.a. Lepoittevin d'Égreville, the son of a well-known actor, began very young with botched but adroit novels he signed Vieillerglé.

Le Poitevin de L’Égreville held under him like a schoolmaster armed with his rule, a dozen young people he dealt with "small morons" whom he trained in the art of sharpening the dagger of mind and hit the right spot.

He also authored le Mulâtre, 1824, 4 vol. in-12; le Corrupteur, 1827, 3 vol. in-12. He wrote melodramas for the Cirque-Olympique and the théâtres des boulevards, particularly la République, l’Empire et les Cent-Jours, in 4 acts and 19 tableaux, 1832, in-8°; l’Empereur, historical event in 5 tableaux, 1832. With Étienne Arago, he composed the vaudevilles Stanislas, ou la Suite de Michel et Christine and Un jour d’embarras, 1824. In 1828, he anonymously had a leaflet entitled Des journaux et des théâtres published.

== Sources ==
- Biographie universelle ancienne et moderne, vol. 24, Paris, Michaud, 1854, p. 234.
