= Charles-Maurice Descombes =

French playwright and literary critic (1782–1869)

- Born: Jean Charles François Maurice; 26 March 1782; Paris
- Died: 7 September 1869 (aged 87); Paris
- Occupations: Playwright, writer

Charles-Maurice Descombes, real name Jean Charles François Maurice, (26 March 1782 – 7 September 1869) was a 19th-century French playwright, theatre critic and writer.

== Biography ==
François Guizot's private secretary, literary critic, founder, owner, printer, chief editor and director of the Le Camp-volant (1819-1820), the Journal des théâtres, de la littérature et des arts (1820-1823), the Le Coureur des spectacles (1842-1849), he was managing editor of the Courrier des théâtres, de la littérature, des arts, des modes from 12 April 1823 to 14 May 1842 and of the Nouvelles des théâtres, de la littérature et des arts from 13 July 1842 to 17 September 1842.

An author of theoretical works on theater, he showed himself a staunch opponent of the romantic school.

His plays were presented on the most important Parisian stage of his time including the Théâtre de la Porte-Saint-Martin and the Théâtre de l'Impératrice.

He married Geneviève Isabelle Vauvilliers on 8 August 1811.

== Works ==
- 1805: Les Consolateurs, comedy in 1 act and in verses
- 1805: Le Parleur éternel, comedy in 1 act and in verses
- 1807: Gibraltar, vaudeville in 3 acts
- 1807: La Cigale et la fourmi, comedy in 1 act and in prose
- 1807: Les Trois manières, comedy in 1 act and in verses
- 1810: Le Luxembourg, comédie-tableau, in 1 act, in prose
- 1818: Le Misanthrope, en opéra-comique, comedy in 1 act, in verses
- 1822: M. Benoît, ou l'Adoption, historical drama in 3 acts, in prose
- 1823: La Lettre anonyme, comedy in 1 act and in prose, with Henri Franconi
- 1823: Le Petit clerc, comédie vaudeville in 1 act, with Paul Auguste Gombault
- 1832: Esquisse de quelques scènes de l'intérieur de la Bourse, pendant les journées des 28, 29, 30 et 31 juillet dernier
- 1832: A Louis-Philippe, roi, Charles-Maurice, homme de lettres, pamphlet
- 1850: La Vérité-Rachel, examen du talent de la première tragédienne du théâtre français
- 1852: Un grand malheur ! par un rentier à 600 francs
- 1856: Histoire anecdotique du théâtre, de la littérature et de diverses impressions contemporaines, tirée du coffre d'un journaliste, avec sa vie à tort et à travers, 2 vols.
- 1859: Le Théâtre-Français, monument et dépendances
- 1860: Tous les genres du théâtre et sujets correspondants, epistles en free verses
- 1863: Feu le Boulevard du Temple, résurrection épistolaire
- 1864: Tablettes d'un gentilhomme sous Louis XV, faits inédits
- 1865: Théâtre, histoire, anecdotes, mots, épaves
- 1868: Poésies diverses, poems

== Bibliography ==
- Gustave Vapereau, Dictionnaire universel des contemporains, vol.2, 1870, (p. 1233-1234) (read online)
- Paul Ginisty, Anthologie du journalisme du XVIIe siècle à nos jours, 1922, (p. 374)
- Patrick Berthier, Le théâtre au XIXe siècle, 1986, (p. 22)
- Jean-Louis Tamvaco, Ivor Forbes Guest, Les cancans de l'Opéra, 2000, (p. 929)
