= Polyanthe =

French physician, painter, engraver and playwright

Alexandre Chaponnier called Polyanthe (24 February 1793 in Paris – 26 July 1852 in the 10th arrondissement of Paris) was a 19th-century French physician, painter, engraver, and playwright.

Also known under the sole first name Alexandre, he was the son of the French painter and engraver of Swiss origin Alexandre Chaponnier (Genève 1753-Paris 1835).

== Biography ==
Throughout his life, Alexander Chaponnier led several front activities: that of physician and surgeon, that of writer and playwright and that, like his father, of painter and engraver.

The titles recalled in his works alone summarize the full range of his personal and professional choices: "médecin de la Faculté de Paris, chirurgien-accoucheur, démonstrateur d'anatomie à l'usage des peintres et professeur de physiologie; membre correspondant de l'Académie Royale de Rouen et de plusieurs sociétés savantes".

His practitioner activity occupied most of his time. Holder of a doctorate in medicine from the Faculty of Paris, he was a doctor, surgeon-obstetrician then moved towards teaching and research in oncology, diseases of bones and skin lesions where he advocated the use of barium carbonate.

As a playwright, he is best known for his participation under the pen name Polyanthe, with Antier and Saint-Amand, to the writing of the drama L'Auberge des Adrets, premiered in 1823. Meant to be a dark melodrama, Frédérick Lemaître, sensing the failure of the play, conceived to turn it into a joke. If Antier and St. Amand took their advantage of the changes introduced by Lemaitre, Polyanthe vowed "relentless grudge" to the famous actor.

== Works ==
- Theatre
  - 1823: L'Auberge des Adrets, three-act drama, with Antier and Saint-Amand, Théâtre de l'Ambigu-Comique (2 July)
  - 1828: Quatre heures, ou Le Jour du supplice, three-act melodrama by Alexandre and Saint-Amand, Théâtre de la Gaîté (23 February)
- Medicine
  - 1827: La chirurgie sans chirurgiens [...], par le docteur Chaponnier médecin-accoucheur, médecin de la Faculté de Paris, Binet éditeur à Paris
  - 1829: La physiologie des gens du monde, pour servir de complément à l'éducation, ornée de planches, par le Ch[evalie]r Chaponnier, médecin de la Faculté de Paris, Firmin-Didot Frères éditeurs à Paris
  - 1834: Recherches physiologiques sur quelques reptiles, par M. le docteur Chaponnier in Précis analytique des travaux de l'Académie de Rouen
  - 1842: Nouveau traitement des scrofules, des dartres lymphatiques et de la carie des os par le carbonate de baryte [...], par le Ch[evalie]r Chaponnier, à Paris chez l'auteur, rue Hauteville, n° 57
  - 1844: Notice sur l'emploi du carbonate de baryte pour la guérison des maladies des os, par le Dr Chaponnier, à Paris chez l'auteur, rue Hauteville, n°57
  - 1850: Notice sur l'emploi du carbonate de baryte pour la guérison du cancer, par Chaponnier médecin de la Faculté, chez l'auteur rue Hauteville, n°57, à Paris
  - 1851: Guérison des scrofules, de la carie des os et des dartres lymphatiques, par Chaponnier médecin et professeur, à Paris chez l'auteur, rue Hauteville, n°57
- Art
  - s.d. : La Parure, color print signed Chaponnier Fils, Musée de la Rose in L'Haÿ-les-Roses (Val-de-Marne)
  - 1809: Calvin, after the original housed at the Bibliothèque de Genève, engraving signed Alex[an]dre Chaponnier fils sculpt, Collège Calvin
  - 1813: Les bédouins, ou La tribu du Mont-Liban, pantomime by Frédéric Dupetit-Méré, costumes by Franconi the younger (Zoraïm) and Franconi the elder (Abulmar) engraved by Chaponnier fils sculp

== Bibliography ==
- Notices nécrologiques sur des membres de l'Académie - V - M. Chaponnier membre correspondant, par M. Ballin in Précis analytique des travaux de l'Académie des Sciences, Belles-Lettres et Arts de Rouen pendant l'année 1852-1853 (pages 75 to 78).
