= Antonio Franconi =

Italian equestrian

Antonio Franconi (1737 in Udine, Italy - 1836 in Paris, France) was an Italian equestrian.

He started as a juggler and wandering physician, then arranged bullfights in Lyon and Bordeaux. In 1783, he associated with the English horse rider Philip Astley who had opened a riding school in Paris and founded an equestrian theater named Cirque Olympique (French, Olympic circus), which acquired an impressive reputation.

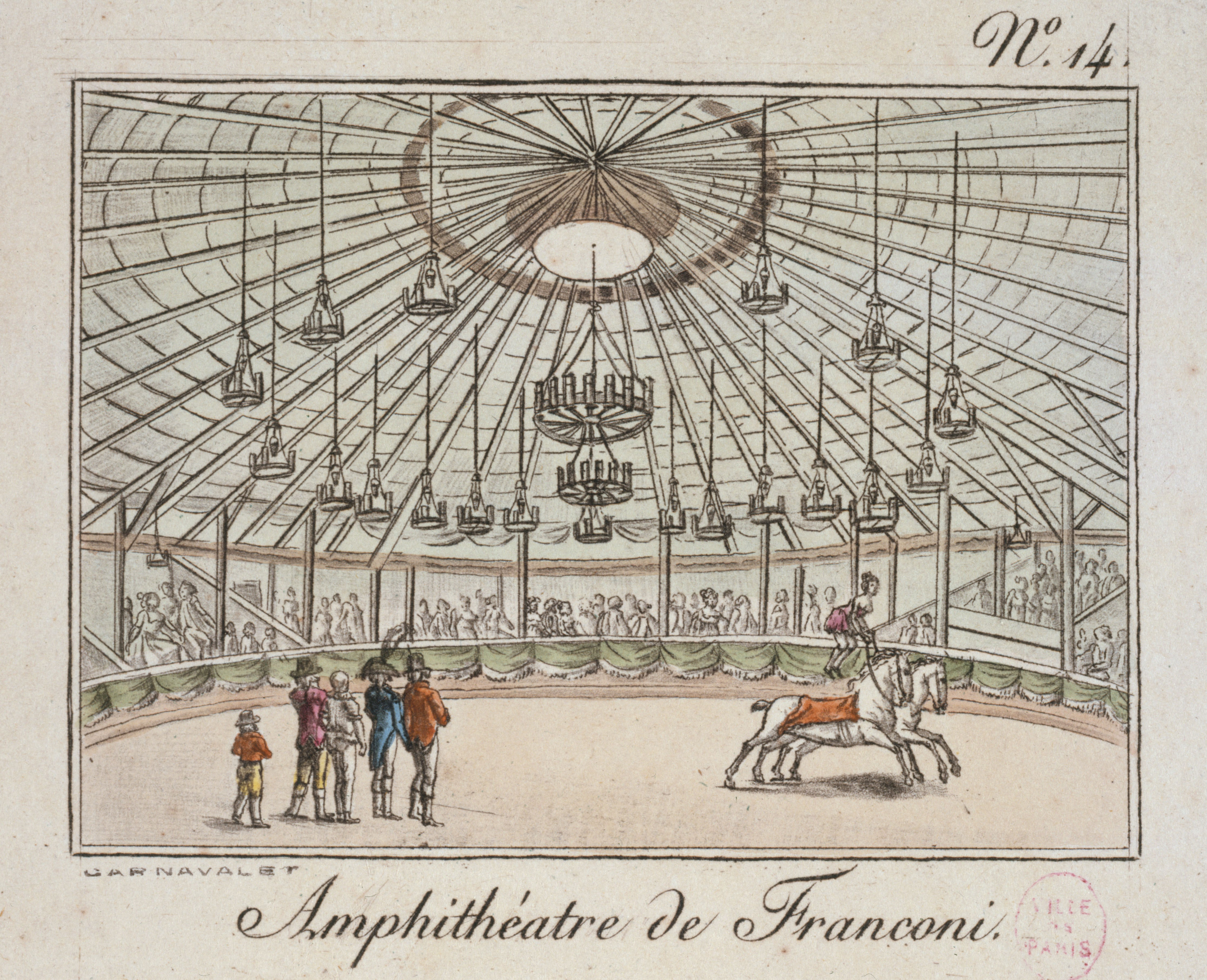
Amphithéâtre de Franconi.

His sons and grandsons continued to attract the public with the talent of their squired and the perfection of their showmanship in their fantasy and military plays. The last famous squire bearing this name was Laurent Franconi who died in 1849.

Napoleon once remarked acidly to his marshal Joachim Murat, who was attired in an extravagant Polish uniform after the Battle of Heilsberg in 1807, that he looked like Franconi ("Vous avez l'air de Franconi").
