= Saint-Amand (writer) =

French playwright

Saint-Armand, real name Jean-Armand Lacoste, (17 November 1797 – 13 January 1885) was a 19th-century French playwright. He was born and died in Paris.

Saint-Armand wrote the famous drama l’Auberge des Adrets in collaboration with Benjamin Antier and Polyanthe.

== Works ==
- La Folle de Toulon, three-act drama, mingled with songs;
- Marie Rose ou la nuit de Noël, three-act drama, with Adrien Payn, 1832;
- Moellen ou l’Enfant du bonheur, tableau populaire in 1 act, mingled with couplets;
- L’Oraison de Saint Julien, three-act comédie en vaudeville;
- Péblo ou Le jardinier de Valence, three-act melodrama.

== Sources ==
- Georges d’Heylli, Gazette anecdotique, littéraire, artistique et bibliographique, t. 1, Paris, Librairie des bibliophiles, 1885, (p. 56)
