= Narcisse Fournier =

French journalist, novelist and playwright (1803–1880)

Narcisse Louis Pierre Fournier (24 November 1803 – 24 April 1880) was a French journalist, novelist and playwright.

== Life ==
He began his literary career aged 22 with two pieces, les Secrets de Cœur and la Poupée. From then on he produced a large number of comedies, vaudevilles and dramas (most often in collaboration), a few novels and articles in several reviews, notably the Revue britannique. He also translated English and German works. His works include - un Grand Orateur (1837); les Suites d’une faute, 1838; Un roman intime; le Bonheur d’être fou; l’Homme au masque de fer; le Jeune Père; un Mari qui n’a rien à faire; les Absences de Monsieur; Pénicaut le somnanbule; M. Candaule ou le roi des maris, la Partie de piquet; le Mal de la peur; Struensée ou la reine et le favori; À la belle étoile; Alexis Petrovich; Histoire d’un espion politique.

Examinateur at the Théâtre-Français and the Théâtre du Vaudeville, Fournier was a chevalier of the Légion d'honneur.

== Sources ==
- Société bibliographique, Revue bibliographique universelle, 2e série, t. 11, Paris, Aux bureaux du Polybiblion, 1880, p. 546
