= Cirque Olympique =

Former equestrian theatre company in Paris

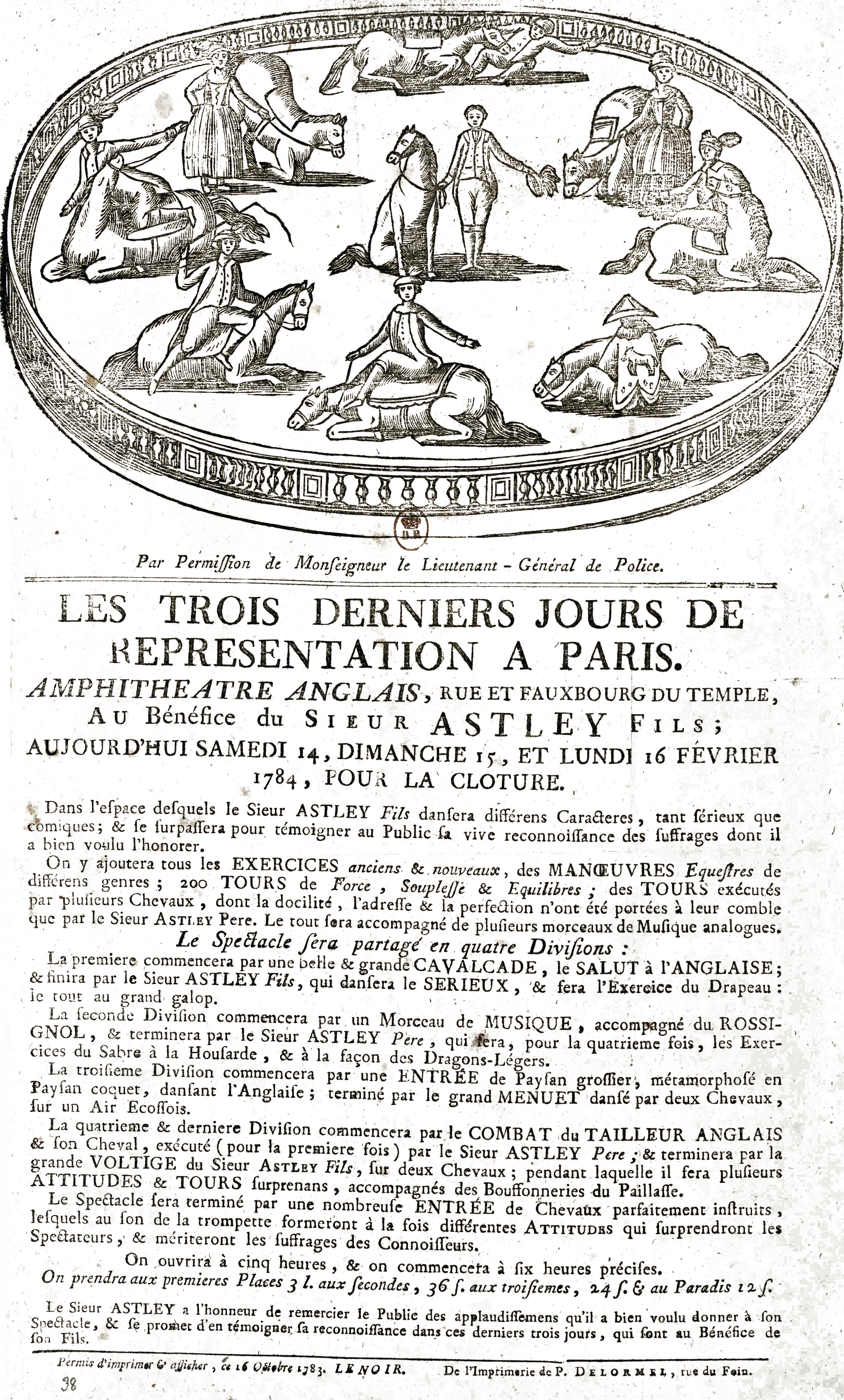
Announcement for the last three days of the 1784 season of the Cirque Anglais

The Cirque Olympique (French pronunciation: [siʁk ɔlɛ̃pik]) in Paris, also known as the Cirque Franconi, was an equestrian theatre company, founded in 1782 by Philip Astley, the English inventor of the modern circus ring, and was initially known as the Cirque d'Astley or the Cirque Anglais.

== Amphithéâtre Anglais ==
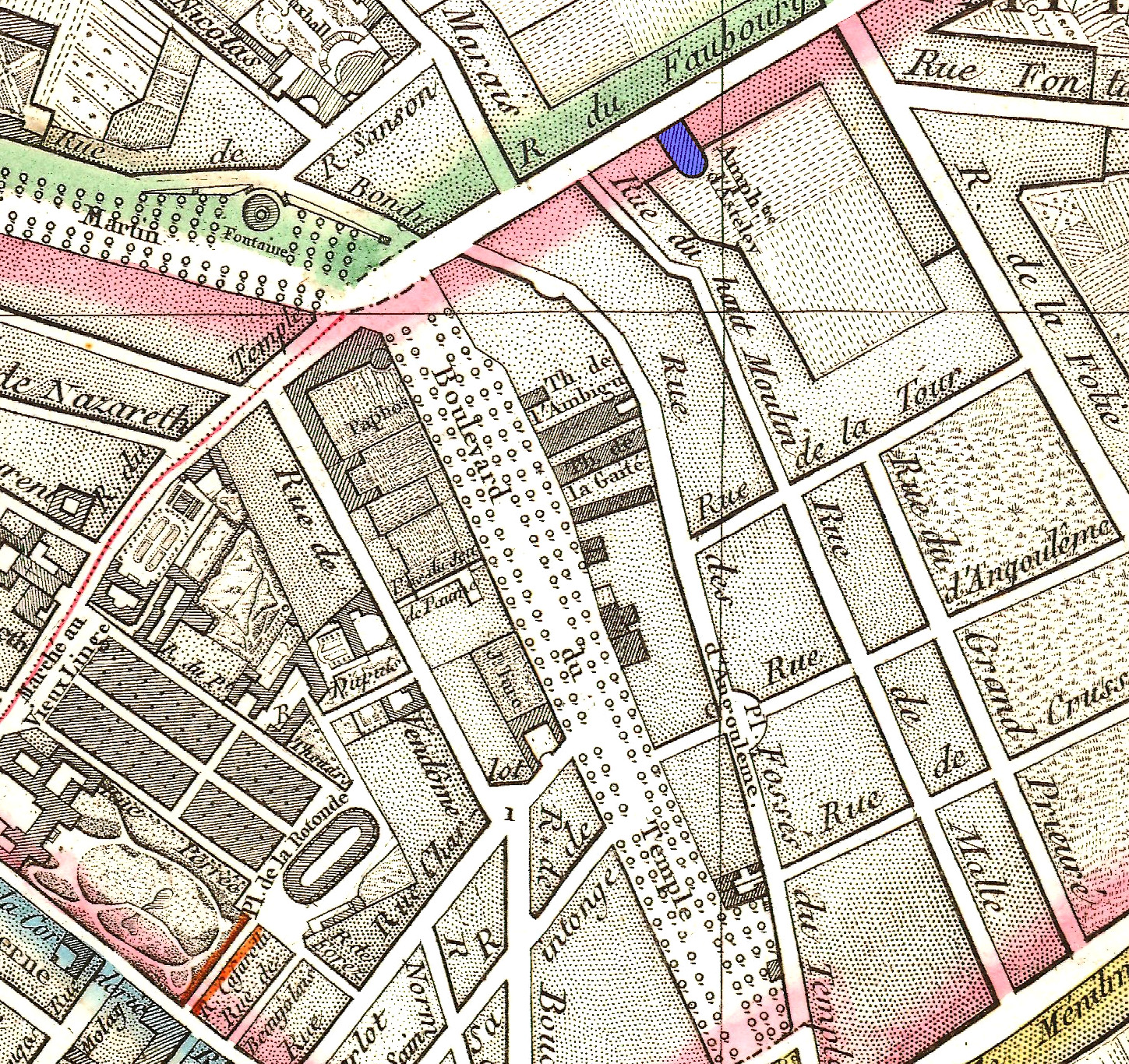
The Amphithéâtre d'Astley (in blue) on an 1814 map of Paris (48.868286°N 2.366352°E)

Astley's theatre, the Amphithéâtre Anglais or Amphithéâtre d'Astley, was the first purpose-built circus building in France. It was located on a large site in the rue du Faubourg du Temple and was a round theatre constructed in wood, with two seating levels and lit by 2,000 candles. The theatre was open four months out of the year and featured equestrian performances interspersed with juggling and other acts.

== Cirque Franconi ==
Astley leased his Parisian circus to Antonio Franconi in 1793, during the French Revolution. Because of the small size of Astley's theatre, Franconi moved the circus to the enclosure of the former Convent of the Capucines, where he constructed stables and a new theatre.

== Cirque Olympique ==
In 1807 Franconi ceded his enterprise to his two sons, Laurent and Henri, who renamed it the Cirque Olympique. With the construction of the rue Napoléon that same year, they were obliged to move again, to a new theatre between the rue du Mont-Thabor and the rue Saint-Honoré. It was leased to them by Francois Delpont and opened on 28 December 1807. The Franconi brothers were forced to close this theatre on 27 May 1816, due to the planned construction of the public treasury at this location.

Cirque Olympique on the rue du Mont Thabor (48.866387°N 2.327138°E)

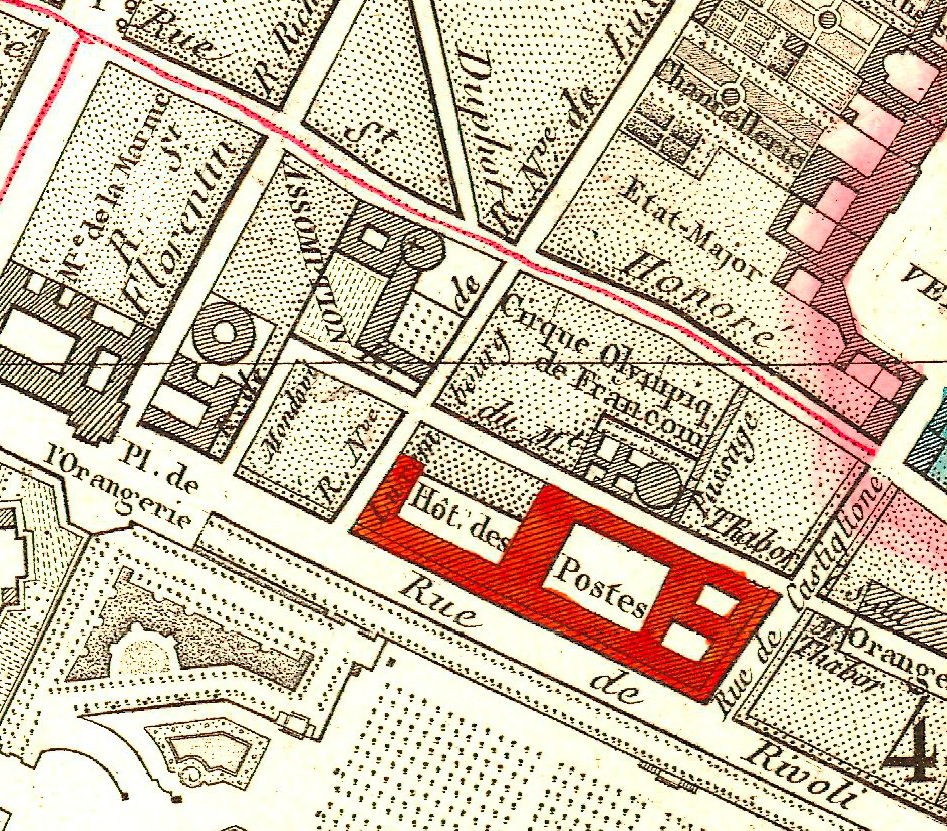
"Cirque Olympique de Franconi" on an 1814 map

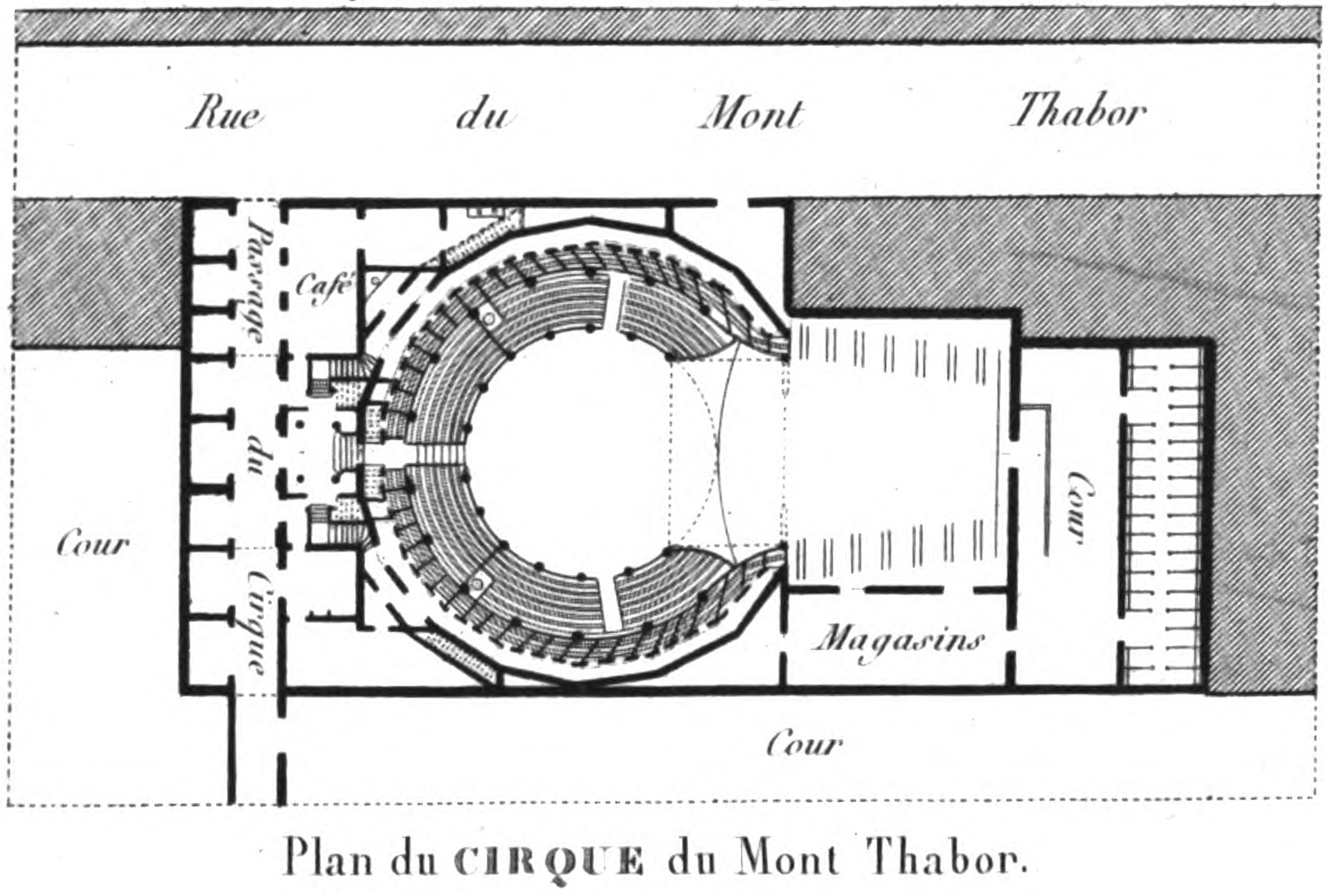
Plan of the Cirque du Mont Thabor

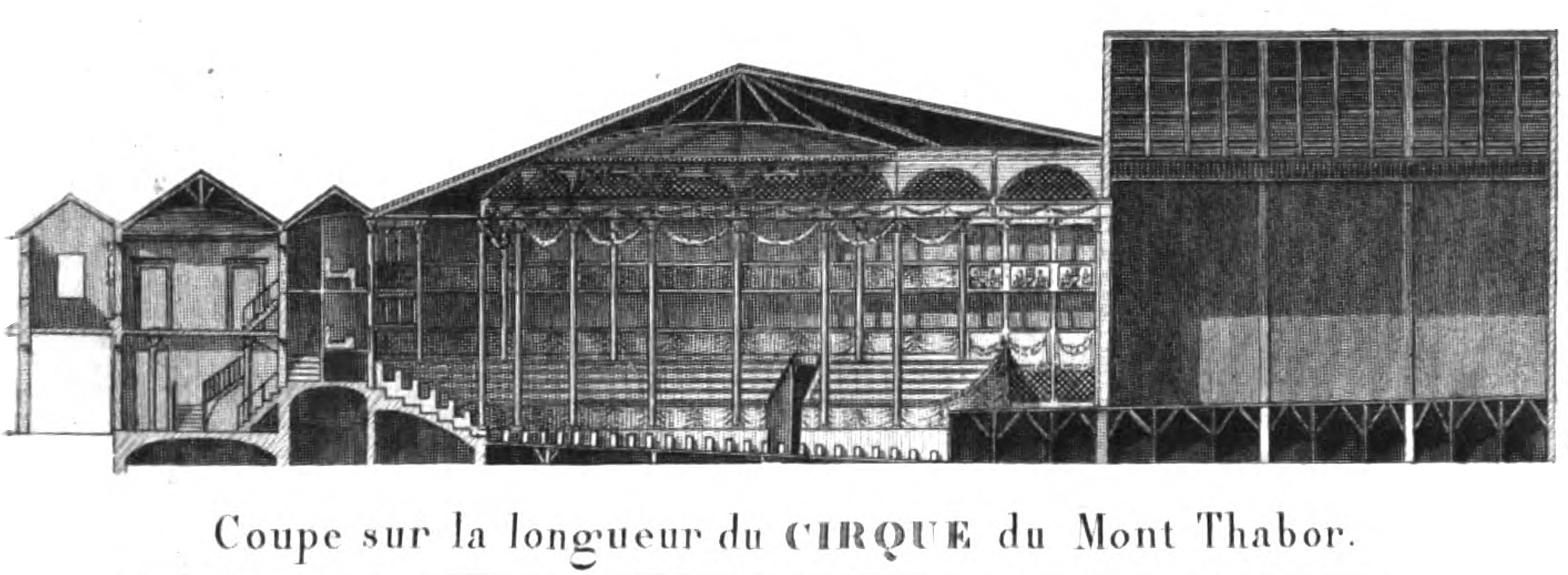
Long section of the Cirque du Mont Thabor

== Return to Astley's theatre ==
The two brothers decided to return to Astley's old theatre on the rue du Faubourg du Temple, making extensive additions and alterations to the theatre and its site and renaming it the Cirque Olympique. They inaugurated the new theatre on 8 February 1817. On the night of 15 March 1826, after a performance of the one-act melodrama L'incendie de Salins, featuring a grand spectacle recreating the dramatic fire at Salins-les-Bains of 27 July 1825, the pyrotechnical effects sparked a genuine fire that burned the theatre to the ground.

Cirque Faubourg du Temple (48.868286°N 2.366352°E)

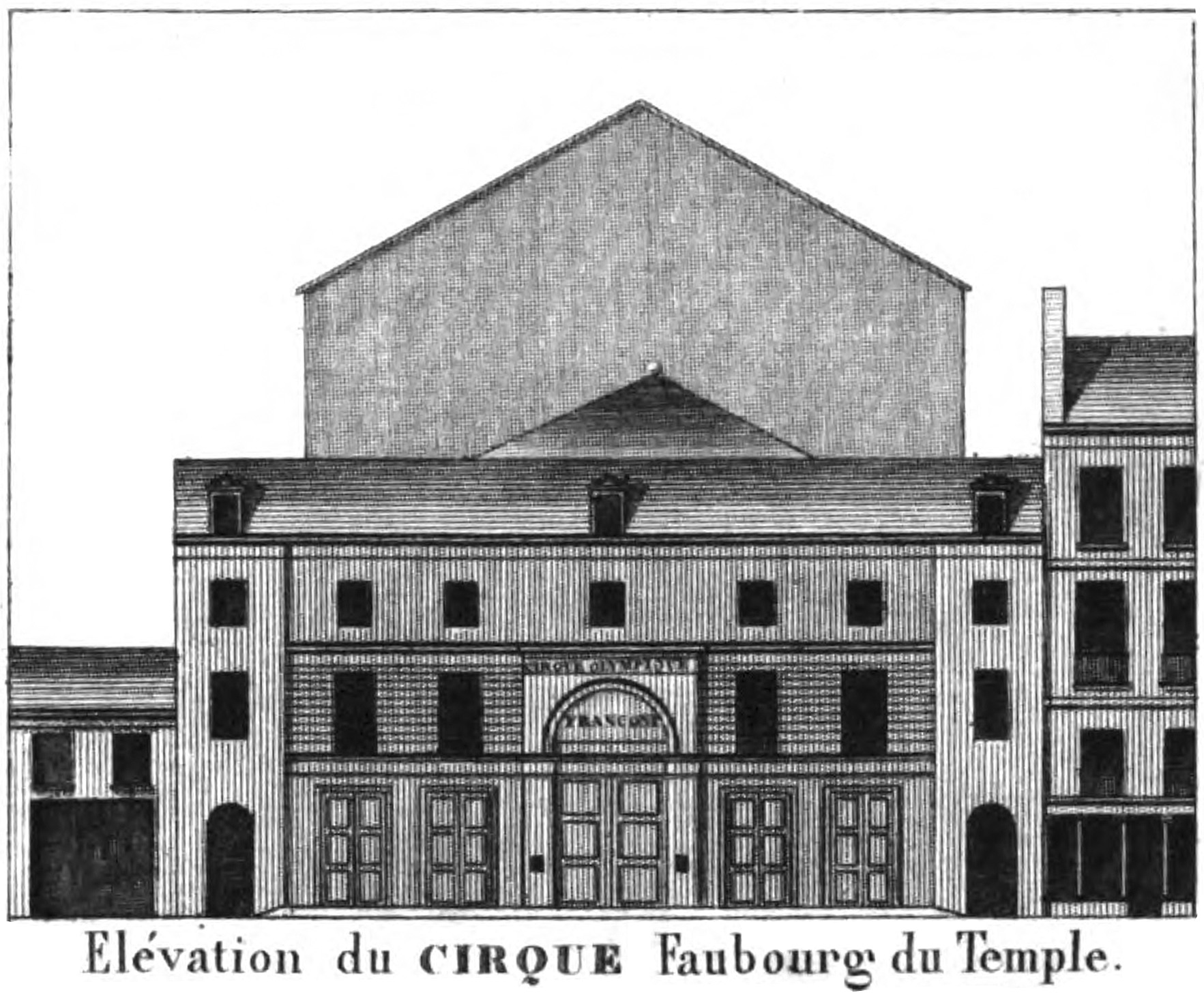
Entrance facade

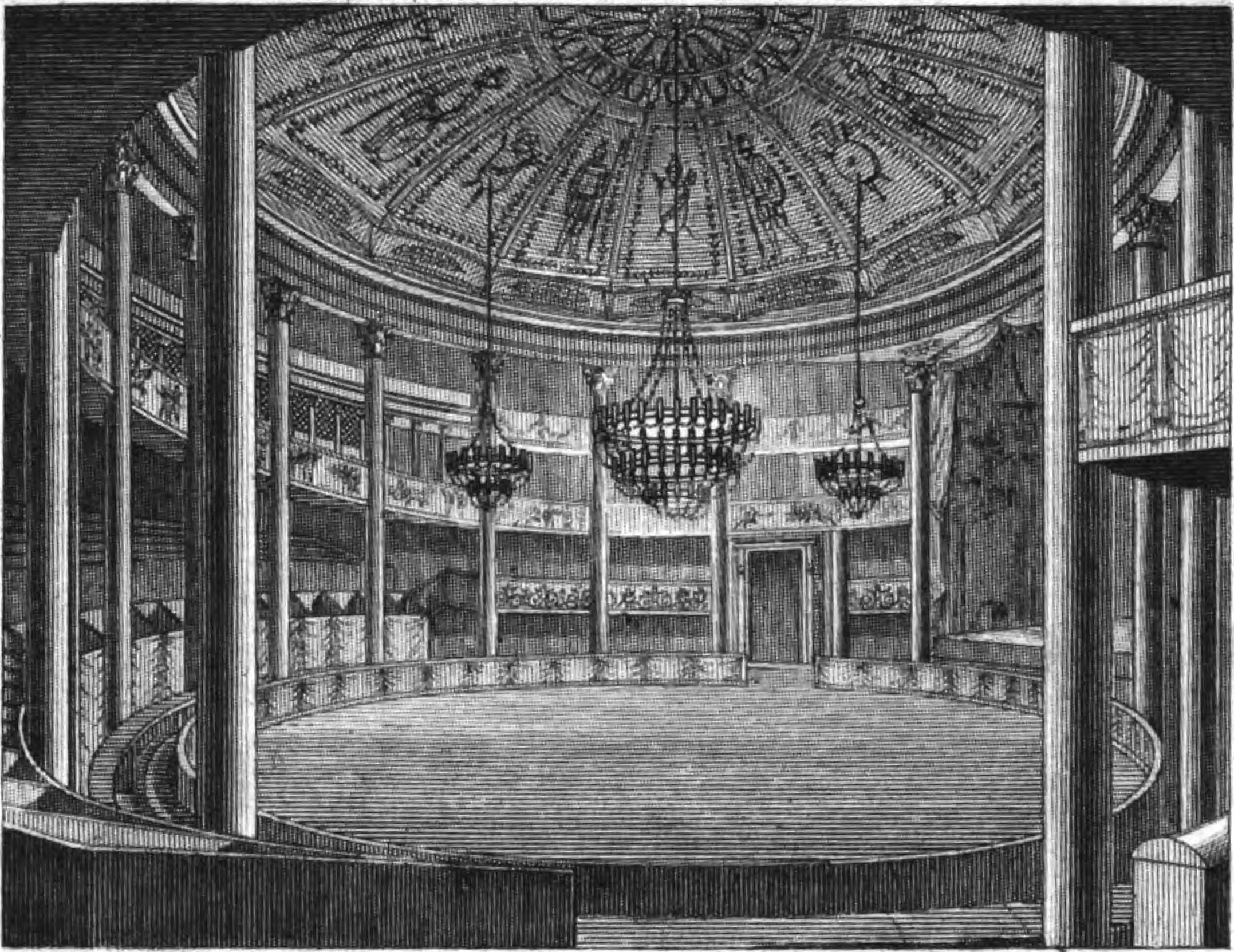
Interior

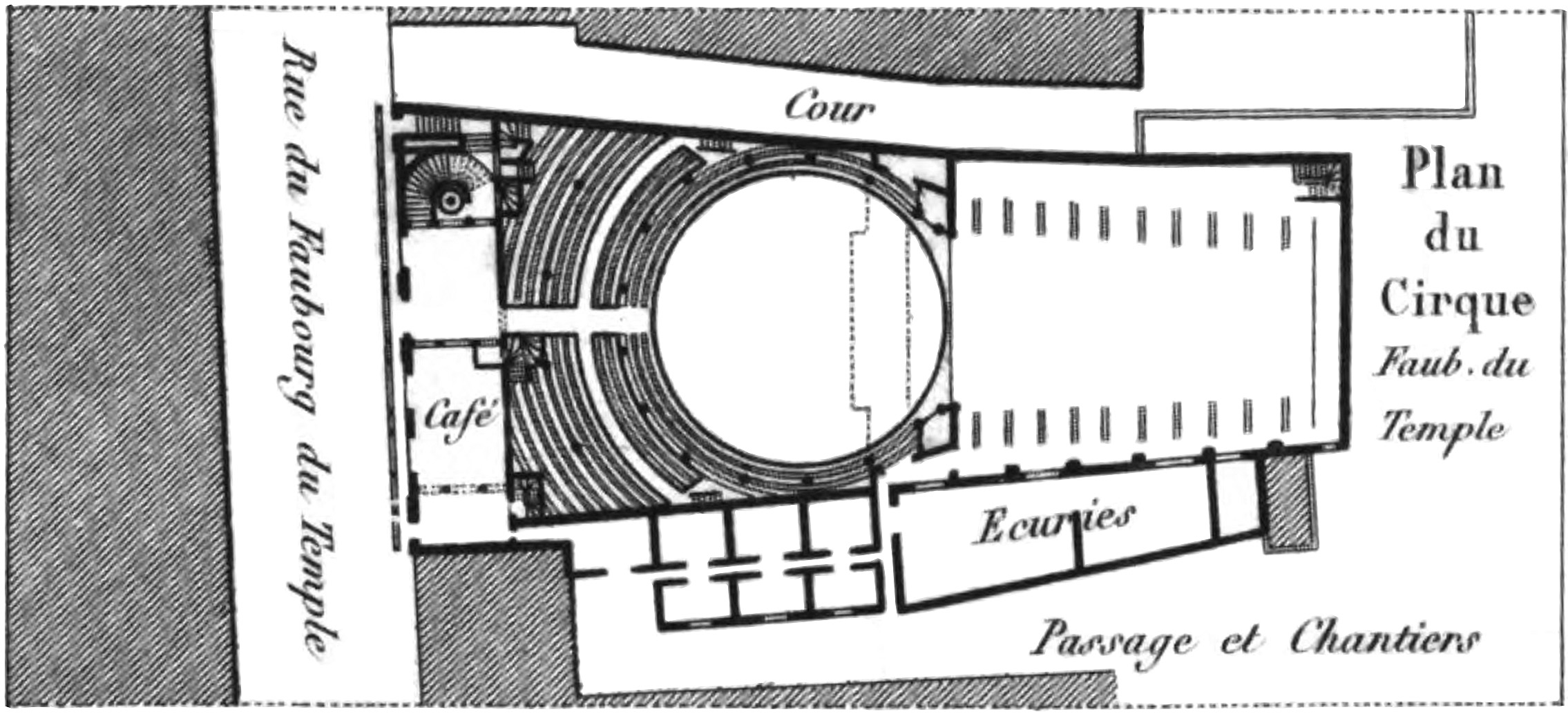
Plan

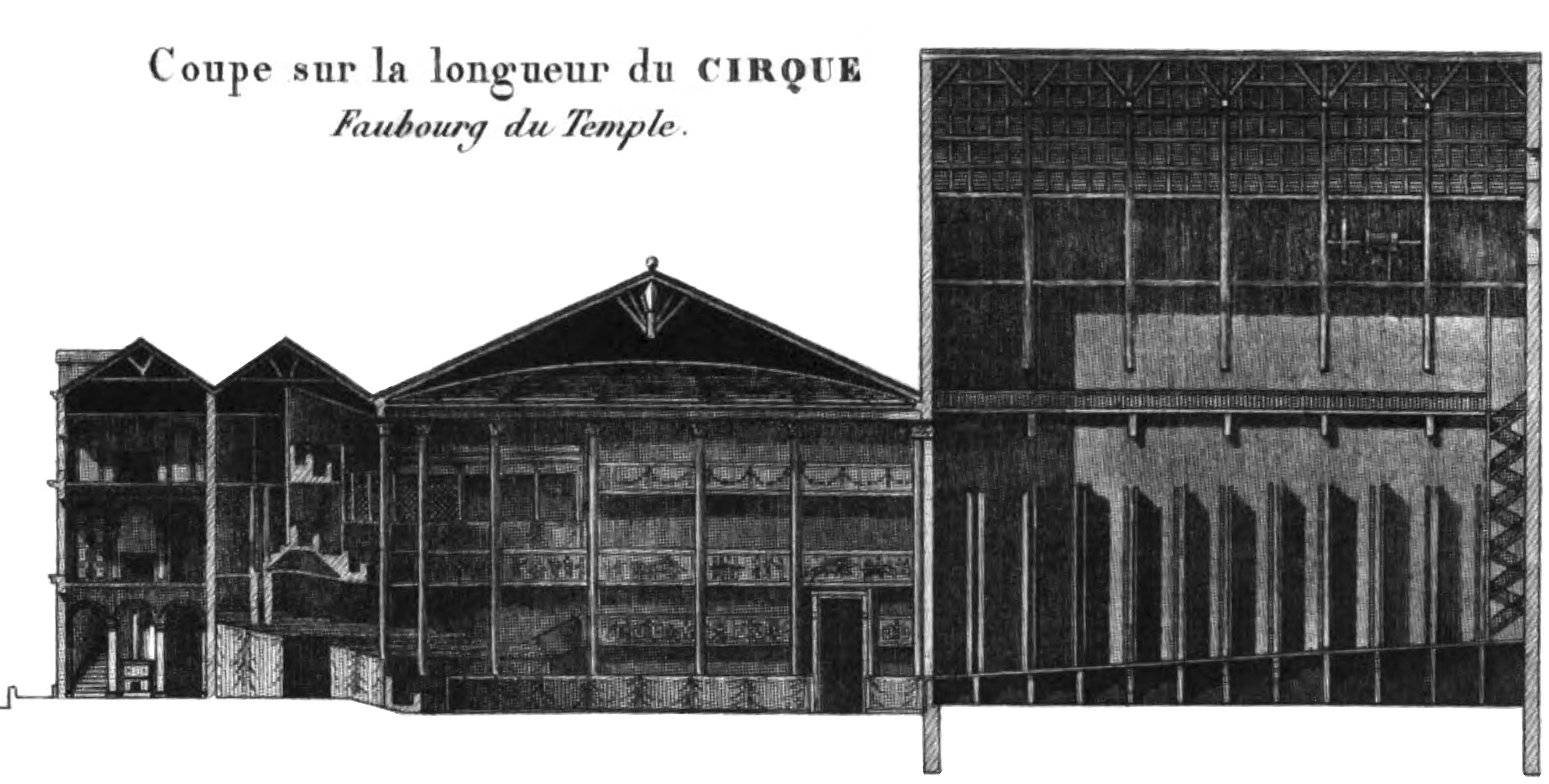
Long section

== Cirque Olympique on the Boulevard du Temple ==
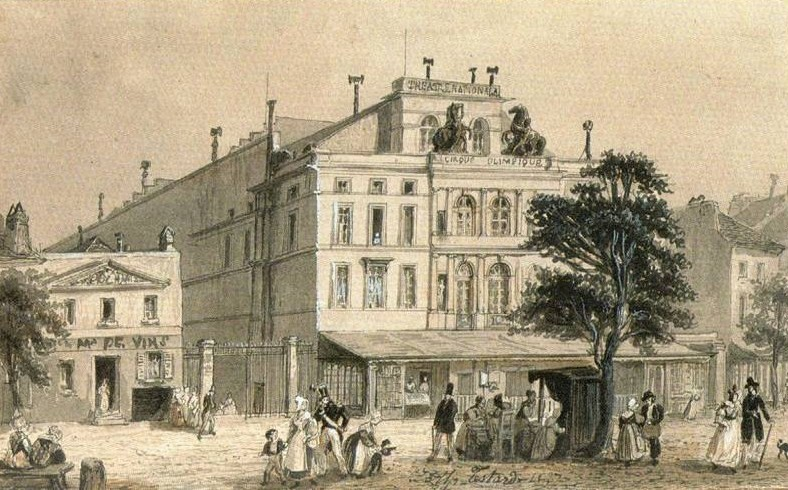
The Cirque Olympique on the Boulevard du Temple in 1837 (48.867°N 2.36554°E)

After the fire which destroyed the Cirque Olympique on the rue Faubourg du Temple, the brothers Franconi moved again, this time to the boulevard du Temple, where they built yet another theatre, also known as the Cirque Olympique. The new theatre, built to the designs of the French architect Alexandre Bourla, was inaugurated on 21 March 1827. It was remodeled in 1847 by the architect Louis Théodore Charpentier for the use of the Opéra-National, which occupied it from 18 June 1844 to 1847. Thereafter it was known as the Théâtre National until 4 July 1853, when it became the Théâtre du Cirque Impérial. The theatre was demolished in 1862 for an urban renewal project, and the director at that time, Hippolyte Hostein, moved the circus to the Théâtre du Châtelet.
