= Châteauvieux =

Châteauvieux may refer to the following places in France:

- Châteauvieux, Hautes-Alpes, a commune in the department of Hautes-Alpes
- Châteauvieux, Loir-et-Cher, a commune in the department of Loir-et-Cher
- Châteauvieux, Var, a commune in the department of Var
- Châteauvieux-les-Fossés, a commune in the department of Doubs

People with the name Châteauvieux:

- Michel Lullin de Chateauvieux (1695-1781), Swiss author and experimenter on agriculture
- Michel Lullin de Chateauvieux (1754 - 1802), Swiss agronom, and grandson of Michel Lullin de Chateauvieux (1695-1781)
- Armand-François Chateauvieux (1770–?), dramatist and playwright
