= Louis-Sébastien Lebrun =

French opera singer

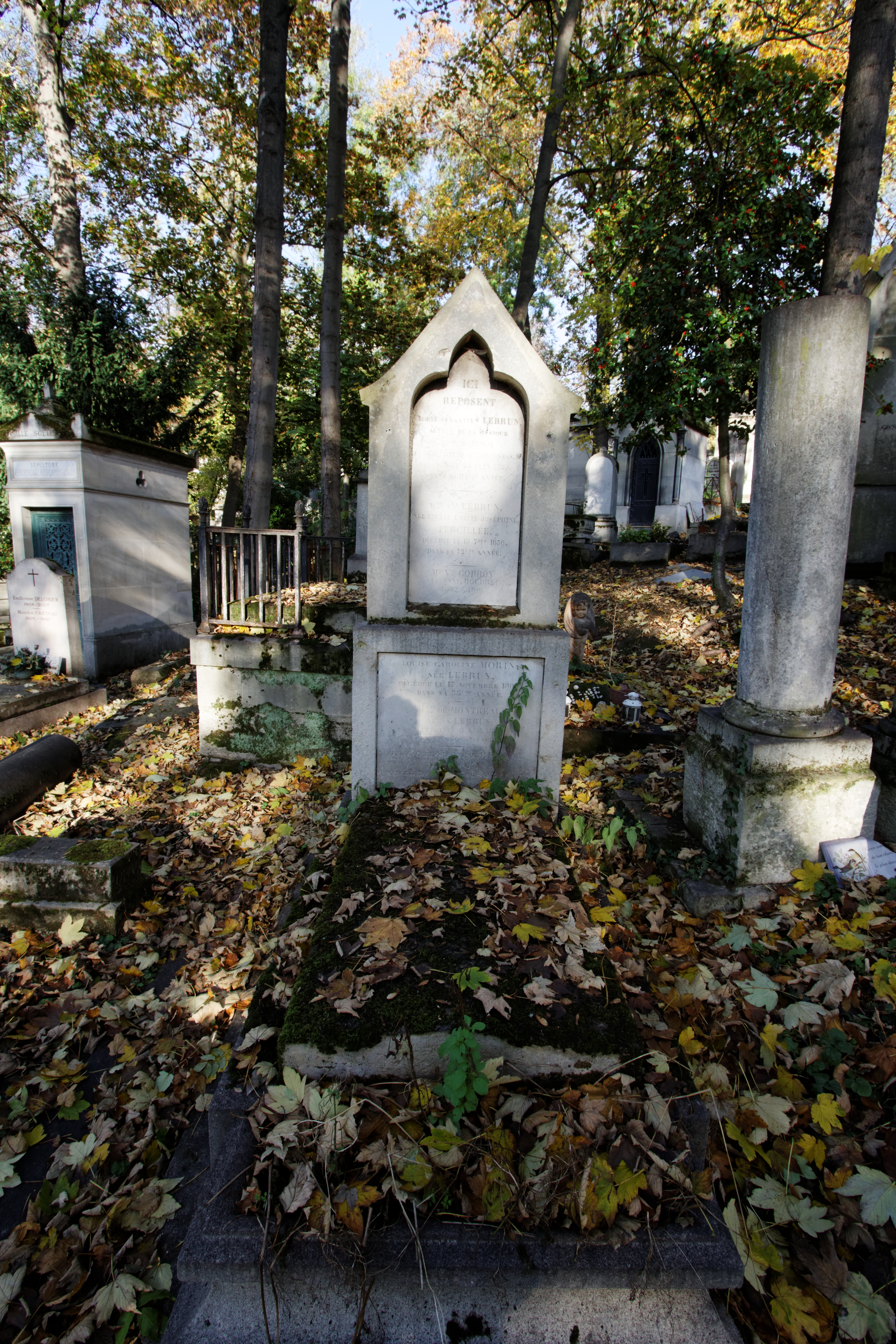
Grave at Père Lachaise Cemetery

Louis-Sébastien Lebrun (10 December 1764 in Paris - 27 June 1829 idem) was a French opera singer and composer.

== Biography ==
As a tenor, he wrote the music of several operas and scenes on booklets, among others, of Charles-Guillaume Étienne, Armand-François Chateauvieux, Armand Croizette, Sewrin and François Bernard-Valville, as well as the music of songs, masses and ariettes.
