= François-Louis Crosnier =

French theatre manager, politician, and playwright (1792–1867)

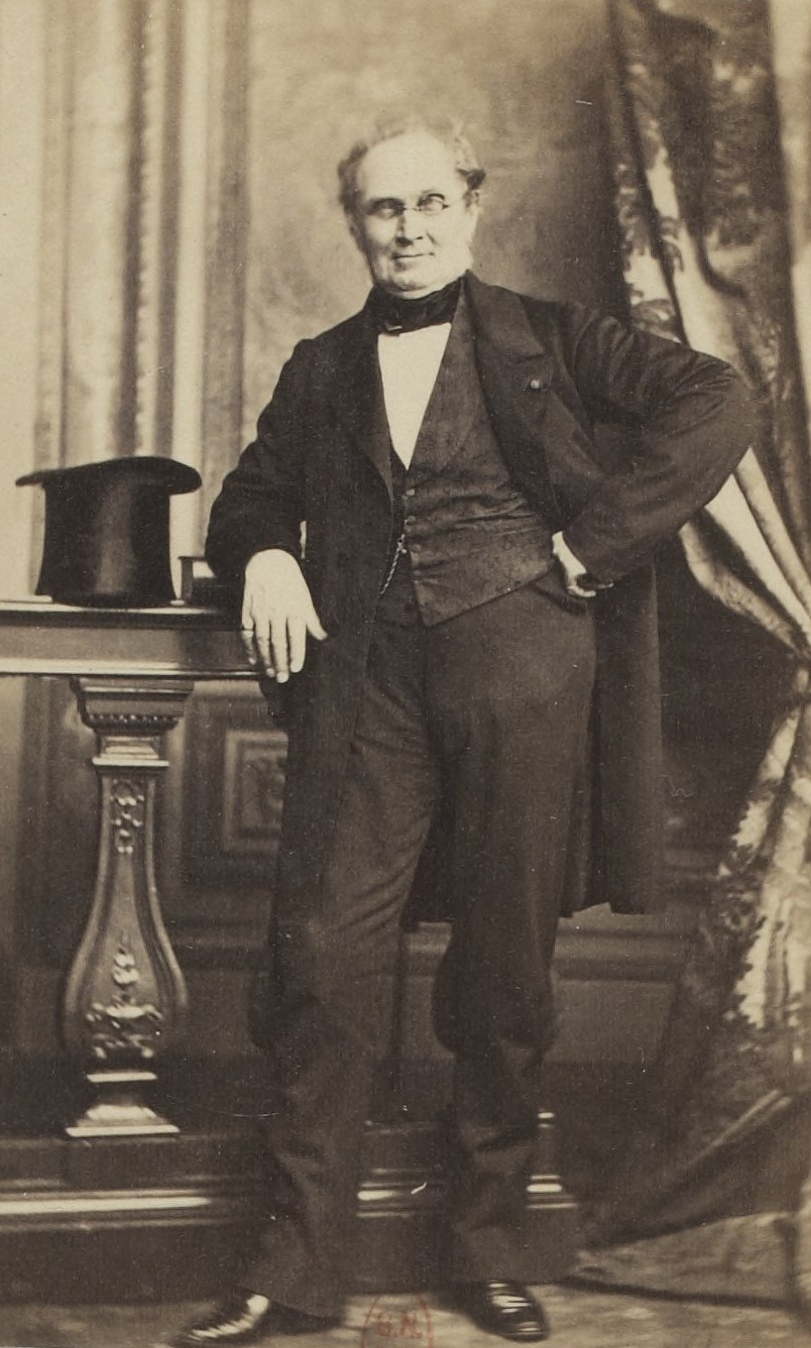
- Born: François-Louis Croisnu; 12 May 1792; Versailles
- Died: 1 September 1867 (aged 75); Lisle, (Loir-et-Cher)
- Other name: Edmond Crosnier (pen name)
- Occupations: Playwright, theatre manager, and politician

François-Louis Crosnier (12 May 1792 – 1 September 1867) was a French theatre manager, politician, and playwright, who used the pen name Edmond Crosnier.

== Biography ==
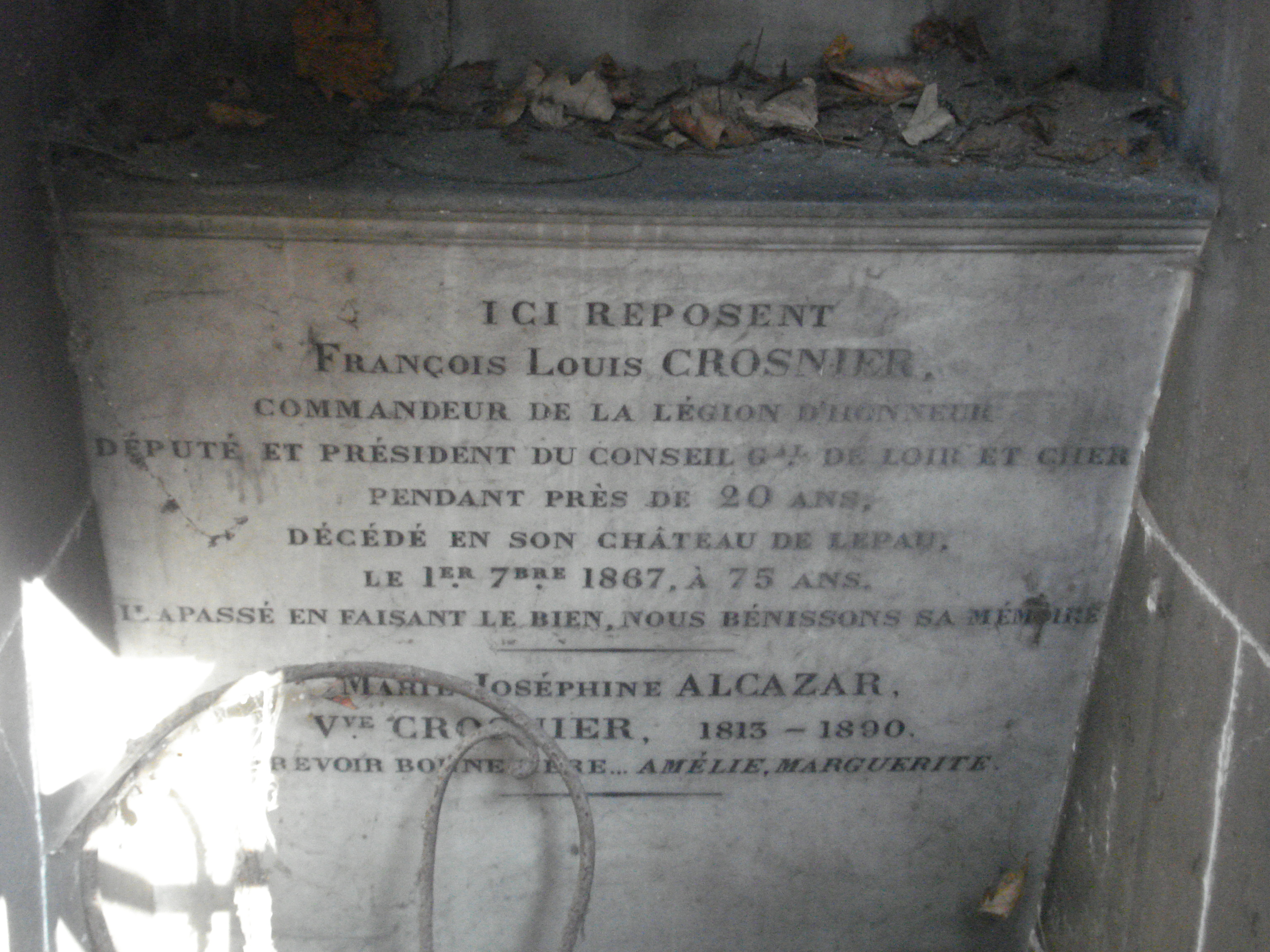
Gravestone of François-Louis Crosnier and his second wife at Montmartre Cemetery

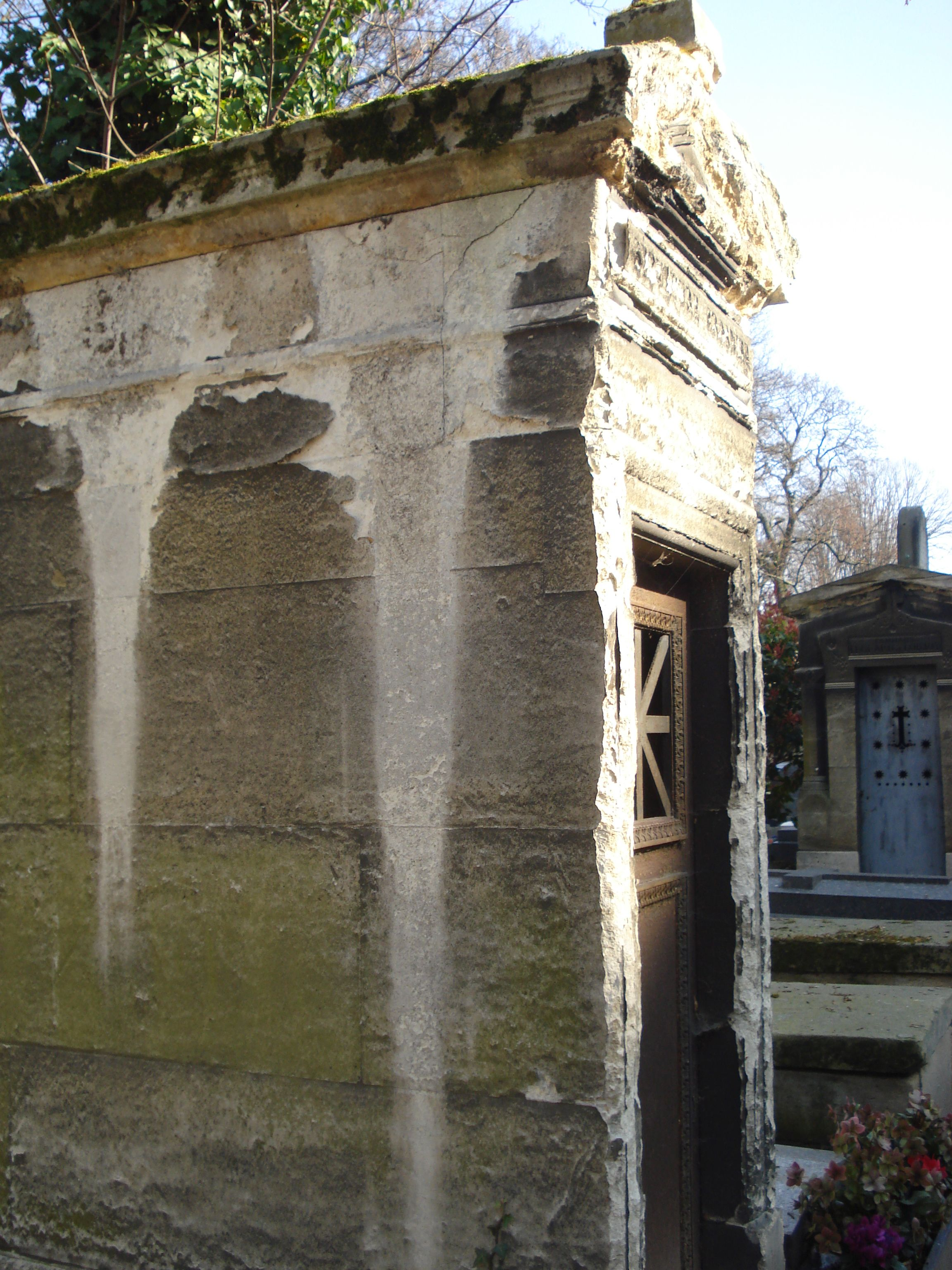
View of the exterior of Crosnier's mausoleum at Montmartre Cemetery

Born François-Louis Croisnu, he was the son of Louis Croisnu, who adopted the name Crosnier, and Marie-Barbe Constantin, concierges of the Opera, who kept the post for over 35 years. François-Louis first married Françoise-Charlotte-Félix Berville Vallouy and in second nuptials, Marie-Joséphine Alcasar, who was the widow of Casimir-Anne-Marie Broussais, the son of François Broussais.

Early in life he became a playwright, whose plays were performed on the most important Parisian stages of the 19th century, including the Théâtre de la Porte-Saint-Martin, the Théâtre de la Gaîté, the Théâtre de l'Odéon, and the Théâtre de l'Ambigu-Comique. However, failing to achieve great success and acquiring a large fortune through marriage, he abandoned playwriting for other endeavours.

Chef de bataillon in the Garde nationale at Pantin, he became managing director of the Théâtre de la Porte-Saint-Martin (1830-1832), the Opéra-Comique (1834-1845) and the Opéra de Paris (1854-1856), and a politician, as conseiller général of the canton de Morée (1845-1867), président of the Conseil général (1849-1866), and député for the Loir-et-Cher in the Corps législatif (1852–1867).

He was very successful managing the Opéra-Comique, a theatre in full-blown financial crisis when he took over in 1834. He brought the theatre back to prosperity by staging a large number of successful works, among the most remarkable being Lestocq and Le cheval de bronze by Daniel Auber, L'éclair by Fromental Halévy, Les chaperons blancs by Auber, Sarah by Albert Grisar, the Le postillon de Lonjumeau by Adolphe Adam, L'ambassadrice and Le domino noir by Auber, Le brasseur de Preston by Adam, La fille du régiment by Gaetano Donizetti, and Zanetta, Les diamants de la couronne, Le duc d'Olonne, and La sirène by Auber.

He died at Lisle, in the château de l'Épau, near Vendôme, the town where he was mayor, on 1 September 1867 (acte n° 4, vue 442/469 du registre) and is buried in the Montmartre Cemetery in a chapel of the 15th division, where he lies alongside his father and his two spouses.

== Works ==
- 1816 : Le Huit juillet, ou Trois fêtes pour une, vaudeville in 1 act
- 1817 : La Pièce en perce, comedy in 1 act, mixed with vaudevilles, with Armand Croizette
- 1820 : Paris, le 29 septembre 1820, impromptu mixed with couplets, with Desprez
- 1820 : La pièce d'emprunt ou le compilateur, comedy in 1 act, mixed with vaudevilles, with Amable de Saint-Hilaire
- 1821 : Les Ermites, comédie-vaudeville in 1 act, with Michel-Nicolas Balisson de Rougemont and Aimé Desprez
- 1821 : Jocrisse paria, tragédie burlesque in 1 act in verses, with Amable de Saint-Hilaire
- 1822 : Le Meurtrier, ou le Dévouement filial, hidtorical melodrama in 3 acts, à spectacle, with Amable de Saint-Hilaire
- 1823 : Le Contrebandier, melodrama in 3 acts à spectacle
- 1823 : Le Mariage à la turque, vaudeville in 1 act, with Desprez
- 1823 : L'École du scandale, play in 3 acts and in prose, imitée de Sheridan, with de La Salle
- 1824 : Le Mauvais sujet, comedy in 1 act, mixed with couplets, with Dupetit-Méré
- 1824 : Minuit, ou la Révélation, melodrame in 3 acts, à show, with Dupetit-Méré
- 1825 : La fille du musicien, drama in three acts, with Alexandre de Ferrière
- 1825 : Le Canal Saint-Martin, vaudeville in 1 act, with de La Salle
- 1825 : Le Voyage à Reims, vaudeville in 2 tableaux, with de la Salle
- 1825 : L'Étrangère, melodrama in 3 acts, with Frédéric Dupetit-Méré
- 1826 : Le Caissier, drama in 3 acts, with Armand-François Jouslin de La Salle
- 1826 : La Fête du village, ou le Cadran de la commune, vaudeville in 1 act, with de la Salle
- 1826 : Le Contumace, melodrama in 3 acts, à spectacle, with de La Salle
- 1827 : Louise, drama in 3 acts and in prose, with Dupetit-Méré and Jean-Baptiste Pellissier
- 1827 : Mandrin, melodrama in 3 acts, with Benjamin Antier and Étienne Arago

== Distinction ==
- Commandeur of the Légion d'honneur

== Bibliography ==
- Joseph Marie Quérard (1853). Les supercheries littéraires dévoilées: galerie des auteurs apocryphes, supposés, déguisés, plagiaires, et des éditeurs infidèles de la littérature française pendant les quatre derniers siècles. Vol. V. Paris: L'éditeur. p. 114.
- Georges d'Heylli (1887). Dictionnaire des pseudonymes: nouvelle édition entièrement refondue et augmentée. Paris: Dentu & Cie. p. 94. dHeyl.
- Jean-Jacques Boucher (1984). Histoire du Loir-et-Cher à travers son conseil général de 1790 à nos jours. Kléber Loustau (foreword). Paris: François Sorlot. p. 89.
- "François-Louis Crosnier", in Adolphe Robert and Gaston Cougny, Dictionnaire des parlementaires français (1789–1891), Bourloton, Paris, 1889 Edition details Wikisource
- Tamvaco, Jean-Louis (2000). Les Cancans de l'Opéra. Chroniques de l'Académie Royale de Musique et du théâtre, à Paris sous les deux restorations (2 volumes, in French). Paris: CNRS Editions. ISBN 9782271056856.
