= Drouineau =

Drouineau is a surname. Notable people with the surname include:

- Frank Villard (born François Drouineau), French film actor
- Gustave Drouineau, French novelist
