= Joseph Ernest Sutton de Clonard =

Joseph Ernest Sutton de Clonard (1765, Paris – 28 January 1816, Paris) was an early 19th-century French dramatist.

Attached to the administration of the navy, his plays were presented in Bordeaux as well as at the Théâtre de l'Ambigu, the Théâtre du Vaudeville and the Théâtre des Variétés in Paris.

== Works ==
- 1802: Croutinet, ou Le Salon de Montargis, caricature in 1 act and in vaudevilles,
- 1802: Nicaise tout seul, ou Pas si bête, monologue bouffon, in 1 act, mingled with vaudevilles,
- 1802: Frontin tout seul ou le Valet dans la malle, scène-folie in vaudevilles,
- 1803: M. Botte ou Le négociant anglais, comedy in 3 acts and in prose, with Joseph Servières,
- 1803: L'Ivrogne et sa femme, comédie-parade in 1 act, mingled with vaudevilles, imitation of a fable by La Fontaine, with Armand Croizette,
- 1803: Jean-Baptiste Rousseau, ou le Retour à la piété filiale, comedy in 1 act and in prose, mingled with vaudevilles,
- 1807: L’Épingle et la rose, ou les Talismans d'amour, comédie en vaudeville in 1 act and in prose,
- 1808: Nous allons le voir ou la répétition générale d'une grande fête, hommage impromptu en six scènes,
- 1809: La Ville au village, ou les Hommes tels qu'ils sont, comedy in 1 act mingled with couplets, with Grille,
- 1810: Une Fête de village ou des bienfaits pour tout le monde, divertissement-impromptu in 1 act and in vaudevilles,
- 1812: Les Époux de quinze ans, comedy in 1 act and in prose, mingled with vaudevilles,
- 1812: Les Faux maris ou le Danger des épreuves, comedy in 1 act and in prose.

== Bibliography ==
- Pierre Larousse, Grand dictionnaire universel du XIXe siècle, vol.4, 1867, p.466 (Read online)
