= Louis-François L'Héritier =

French playwright (1788–1852)

- Born: 30 May 1788; Bourg-en-Bresse, France
- Died: 14 July 1852 (aged 64); Paris, France
- Occupations: Playwright; Journalist; Novelist

Louis-François L'Héritier, also known as L'Héritier de l'Ain (30 May 1788 – 14 July 1852), was a French journalist, playwright, novelist, translator, and writer of historical and biographical works.

He contributed to various liberal newspapers and participated in the preparation of several memoirs, including the Mémoires de Vidocq (1828–1829) and the Mémoires pour servir à l'histoire de la Révolution française (1829), published under the name of the executioner Charles-Henri Sanson, with contributions from Honoré de Balzac. He also prepared Henri Ducor's account of his experiences as a prisoner of war, Aventures d'un marin de la Garde impériale, for publication. His translations included Les Veillées allemandes (1838), based on works by Jacob and Wilhelm Grimm.

L'Héritier was also active in republican politics. In March 1832, he and Ferdinand Flocon published a letter defending the role of republican activists in the July Revolution of 1830 and criticizing the conduct of liberal leaders, including Lafayette. In 1848, he served as president of the Société des droits et des devoirs, whose published regulations bore his signature. In November 1848, during military proceedings against Silas-René-Pierre Grandmesnil, vice-president of the society, a police report named L'Héritier among those allegedly attending private political meetings alongside Pierre-Joseph Proudhon, Marc Caussidière, and Ferdinand Flocon.

== Works ==
- 1811: Description d'un instrument servant à faciliter le tracé des tranchées dans l'attaque des places
- 1813: Épître à Chénier
- 1814: Le Diable boiteux à Paris, one-act comédie épisodique, mingled with couplets
- 1818: Les Veillées d'une captive, with Antony Béraud and Auguste Imbert
- 1819: Lettres à David, sur le Salon de 1819, with Émile Deschamps and Henri de Latouche, engraving by Ambroise Tardieu
- 1819: Le Champ-d'Asile, topographical and historical picture of Texas
- 1818–1822: Les Fastes de la gloire ou les Braves recommandés à la postérité, monument élevé aux défenseurs de la Patrie, par une Société d'hommes de lettres et de militaires, 5 vols.
- 1821: Précis, ou Histoire abrégée des guerres de la Révolution française, depuis 1792 jusqu'à 1815, avec Pierre-François Tissot
- 1822: Dernières Lettres de deux amants de Barcelone, with Henri de Latouche
- 1828: Le Convoi de Louis XIV, scène historique inédite
- 1828–1829 Mémoires de Vidocq, chef de la police de sûreté jusqu'en 1827, aujourd'hui propriétaire et fabricant de papiers à Saint-Mandé, 4 vols.
- 1828–1830: Mémoires et souvenirs d'un Pair de France, 4 vols.
- 1829: Les Malheurs d'une libérée.
- 1829: Mémoires pour servir à l'histoire de la Révolution française, par Sanson, exécuteur des arrêts criminels pendant la Révolution, with Honoré de Balzac
- 1835: Aventures d'un marin de la Garde impériale, prisonnier de guerre sur les pontons espagnols, dans l'île de Cabrèra et en Russie, novel, with Ducor
- 1833: La République, histoire de la famille Clairvent, 2 vols.
- 1835: Le Prêche et la Messe, roman chronique des guerres de religion pendant le XVI, 2 vols.
- 1838: Le roi règne et peut gouverner
- 1841: De la Constitution de la Chambre des Pairs
- 1841–1843: Plutarque drôlatique, vie publique et grotesque des illustres de ce temps-ci
- 1844: Le Médecin de soi-même, moyen sûr et peu coûteux de se préserver et de se guérir de toutes les maladies
- 1845: Le Pharmacien de soi-même, complément indispensable du « Médecin de soi-même » et correctif nécessaire de la médication de M. Raspail, contenant plus de 750 recettes ou formules... ou Petite Pharmacopée populaire à l'usage des villes et villages et des praticiens de campagne
- 1868: Les Mystères de la vie du monde, du demi-monde et du quart de monde, ou La vie d'aujourd'hui, novel

== Bibliography ==
- Joseph-Marie Quérard, Les Supercheries littéraires dévoilées, vol.5, 1853, p. 251-252 (read online)
- Antoine-Alexandre Barbier, Olivier Alexandre Barbier, Paul Billiard, Dictionnaire des ouvrages anonymes, 1874, p. 1218
- Gustave Vapereau, Dictionnaire universel des littératures, vol.2, 1876
- Roger Pierrot, Correspondance d'Honoré de Balzac, 1960, p. 766
