= Armand Croizette =

French librettiste and playwright

Armand Croizette (1766, Lyon – 21 January 1841, Versailles city) was a French librettiste and playwright.

== Biography ==
A dramaturge at the Théâtre du Vaudeville then at the Théâtre de l'Ambigu, his plays were performed on the most important Parisian stages of the 19th century, including the Théâtre des Variétés, and the Théâtre de la Gaité.

== Works ==
- 1797: Arlequin protégé par la fortune, ou le Riche du moment, comedy in 3 acts, in prose
- 1800: Maria, ou, La forêt de Limberg, drama in three acts in prose, with Hector Chaussier, Fleureau de Ligny and Armand-François Chateauvieux
- 1801: Le Masque tombé, ou le Bal de l'Opéra, comedy in 1 act, mingled with vaudevilles, with P.G.A. Bonel and Chateauvieux
- 1802: Les Aveugles de Franconville, opera in 1 act, with Chateauvieux
- 1802: Gille en deuil, opera in 1 act, with Marc-Antoine Désaugiers and Jacques-André Jacquelin
- 1803: L'Ivrogne et sa femme, comédie-parade in 1 act, mingled with vaudevilles, with Joseph Ernest Sutton de Clonard
- 1808: M. Dupinceau, ou le Peintre d'enseignes, facétie, with Antoine Simonnin
- 1819: La Pièce en perce, comedy in 1 act, mingled with vaudeville, with Edmond Crosnier and Chateauvieux

== Bibliography ==
- Wilhelm Fleischer, Dictionnaire de bibliographie Française: Ap - Bh, vol.2, 1812, (p. 4769)
- Mémoires de la Société historique et archéologique de l'arrondissement de Pontoise et du Vexin, vol.20-22, 1898, (p. 60)
