= Antony Béraud =

French soldier and author (1791–1860)

Anthony Béraud
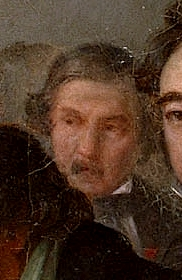
- Antony Béraud sur le tableau de Heim 1847
- Born: Antoine-Nicolas Béraud; 11 January 1791; Aurillac
- Died: 6 February 1860 (aged 69); Paris
- Occupations: Military, chansonnier, writer, poet, historian and playwright.

Antony Béraud, real name Antoine-Nicolas Béraud, (11 January 1791 – 6 February 1860) was a French military, chansonnier, writer, poet, historian and playwright.

== Life ==
In 1809 he entered the École militaire de Saint-Cyr and became second lieutenant. He was then sent to garrison at Milan and took part to the last campaigns of the Empire. Captain, he was captured at the battle of the Mincio River on 8 February 1814. Captain of staff during the Hundred Days, he served at Grenoble then participated to the battle of Waterloo and battle of Ligny where he gained the rank of battalion chief.

Dismissed, degraded and put on half pay under Louis XVIII, he then embarked on literature and collaborated to numerous magazines : Revue et gazette des théâtres, La Minerve, L'Abeille, L'Indépendant, La Boussole politique, La Pandore, Le Siècle, Les Salons de Paris, les Annales de l'école française et des beaux-arts etc.

His poems and songs directed against the Bourbon earned him six months' imprisonment. He was particularly active in the Trois Glorieuses, was awarded the croix de juillet and was returned his Légion d'honneur. He was also reinstated as battalion commander of the National Guard of Paris, a position he would leave in 1834.

In 1832 he was awarded a medal of the city of Paris for his bravery during the cholera epidemic.

Managing director of the Théâtre Saint-Marcel (1839), then of the Théâtre de l'Ambigu (1840-1849), in 1849 he became director of the prison of Belle-Isle en mer (1849-1850).

His plays were performed on the most important Parisian stages, including: Théâtre de l'Ambigu, Théâtre de la Gaîté, Théâtre de la Porte-Saint-Martin, and Théâtre de l'Odéon.

== Works ==
- 1815 : Lettres à mon ami et à ma maîtresse, poems
- 1815 : La dauphinoise, song
- 1826 : Satires ménippées sur les principaux événements de la Révolution française, avec des notes critiques et historiques, par un ancien troubadour
- 1817-1818 : Mémoires pour servir à l'histoire des évènements de la fin du dix-huitième siècle depuis 1760 jusqu'en 1806-1810, 6 vol., with Jean-François Géorgel
- 1818 : Le Champ d'asile, Serrez-vous bien, songs
- 1818 : Les Veillées d'une captive, with Auguste Imbert and Louis-François L'Héritier
- 1819 : Le départ du poète
- 1819 : Les Modes parisiennes, almanach pour l'année 1820
- 1820 : Amour, orgueil et sagesse, short stories
- 1821: La liberté, Ode à David exilé, Le rappel, poems
- 1822 : Trois jours de promenade d'un étudiant en droit
- 1824 : Un mot sur le tableau d'Iphigénie, refusé par le jury de peinture, au Salon de 1824
- 1824 : Nouveaux mémoires pour servir à l'histoire de l'empereur Napoléon
- 1825 : Dictionnaire historique de Paris
- 1827 : Cri d'un vieux soldat à l'ex-garde nationale
- 1831 : Veilles poétiques
- 1832 : Introduction à toutes les histoires de France, ou Histoire des peuples qui ont habité la Gaule, depuis les temps les plus reculés jusqu'à Clovis
- 1833 : Histoire pittoresque de la Révolution française
- 1834 : L'Avenir des peuples, histoire contemporaine des mœurs, des arts, de l'industrie, du commerce, des voyages
- 1835 : Mémoires inédits de Henri Masers de Latude, with Henri Masers de Latude
- 1835 : Veilles patriotiques
- 1836 : Le Pendu, histoire d'une grande dame de la restauration napolitaine et du baron Pierre Férat, aujourd'hui galérien
- 1836 : Versailles et son musée, à-propos en vers
- 1848 : Le Nœud républicain, couplets chantés au banquet fraternel donné par la 5me compagnie du 2me bataillon de la 6e légion

== Theatre ==
- Les Deux coups de sabre, drama in 3 acts, with Charles Puysaye, 1822
- Cardillac ou Le quartier de l'Arsenal, melodrama in three acts, with Léopold Chandezon, 1824
- Les Aventuriers, ou le Naufrage, melodrama in 3 acts, with Léopold Chandezon, 1824
- Cagliostro, melodrama in 3 acts, with Léopold Chandezon, 1825
- Les Prisonniers de guerre, melodrama in 3 acts, with Chandezon, 1825
- La Redingotte et la perruque, ou le Testament, mimodrama in 3 acts à grand spectacle, with Chandezon, 1825
- Charles Stuart, ou le Château de Woodstock, melodrama in 3 acts, à grand spectacle, with Eugène Cantiran de Boirie, 1826
- Le Corregidor ou les Contrebandiers, melodrama in 3 acts, with Chandezon, 1826
- Le monstre et le magicien, melodrama féerique in three acts, with Merle, 1826
- Le monstre et le magicien, melodrama, with Jean-Toussaint Merle and Crosnier, 1826
- Irène ou la prise de Napoli, melodrame in 2 acts, with Chandezon, 1827
- Le vétéran, pièce militaire in 2 acts, with Chandezon, 1827
- Faust, drama in 3 acts, with Jean-Toussaint Merle and Charles Nodier, 1828
- La Duchesse et le page, comedy in 3 acts, in prose, 1828
- Le Siège de Saragosse, pièce militaire in 2 acts à grand spectacle, 1828
- Tom-Wild, ou le Bourreau, melodrama in 3 acts, with Auguste Anicet-Bourgeois, 1828
- Le Fou, drama in 3 acts, with Alexis Decomberousse and Gustave Drouineau, 1829
- Nostradamus, drama in 3 acts and 6 parts, with Valory, 1829
- Adrienne Lecouvreur, with Valory, 1830
- Guido Reni ou Les artistes, play in 5 acts and in verses, with Jean-Nicolas Bouilly, 1833
- Le gars, drama in five acts and six tableaux, 1837
- Lélia, drama in 3 acts, in prose, with Jules-Édouard Alboize de Pujol, 1838
- La verrerie de la gare, drame anecdotique et populaire in 3 acts, 1838
- Le prêteur sur gages, drama in trois acts, with Henri de Saint-Georges, 1838
- Napoléon, drame historique in 3 acts and 5 tableaux, with Théophile Marion Dumersan, 1839
- Meurtre et dévouement, drama in 3 acts, 1839
- Édith ou La veuve de Southampton, drama in 4 acts, with Alphonse Brot, 1840
- Francesco Martinez, drama in three acts, 1840
- Le maître à tous, comedy in 2 acts, with Charles Potier, 1840
- La Lescombat, drama in 5 acts, with Brot, 1841
- Le Miracle des roses, drama in 16 tableaux, with Hippolyte Hostein, 1844
- Le Rôdeur, ou les Deux apprentis, drama in 3 acts, with Chandezon, 1844
- Hortense de Blengie, comédie-drame in 3 acts, with Frédéric Soulié, 1848
- Entre l'enclume et le marteau, comédie en vaudevilles in 1 act, 1850
- Taconnet, ou l'Acteur des boulevards, vaudeville in 5 acts, with Clairville, 1852
- Un Festival, comédie en vaudevilles in 1 act, 1853
- Les Guides de Kinrose, drame-vaudeville in 2 acts, with Édouard Brisebarre, 1854

== Bibliography ==
- Gustave Vapereau, Dictionnaire universel des contemporains, (p. 169) read on line
- Pierre Larousse, Grand Dictionnaire Universel du XIXe siècle, 1865, (p. 595) read on line
- Camille Dreyfus, André Berthelot, La Grande encyclopédie, 1886, (p. 259)
- Guillaume de Bertier de Sauvigny, Alfred Fierro, Bibliographie critique des mémoires sur la Restauration, 1988, (p. 28)
- Edward Forman, Historical Dictionary of French Theater, 2010, (p. 24)
