= Armand-François Chateauvieux =

French dramatist and playwright

Anne-François-Raymond de Choson de Lacombe called Armand-François Chateauvieux or A.-F.-R.-C.-L. Chateauvieux (25 September 1770 in Villefranche-de-Rouergue – Belgium between 1819 and 1833) was a 19th-century French dramatist and playwright.

== Biography ==
His plays have been performed among others at the Théâtre des Variétés, the Théâtre du Palais-Royal and the Théâtre de l'Ambigu-Comique. The absence of works represented or published between 1803 and 1815 can be explained by a sentence of 8 years of jail imposed on 29 prairial year XI (19 June 1803) by the Special Court of Paris for "forgery in authentic and public writing".

He arrived at the Brest Prison in July 1803, where he remained under no. 3052 until his release on 25 July 1811. A convinced bonapartist, he hailed the return of the Emperor from the Island of Elba by publishing l'Ambition de Napoléon dévoilée probably in March. After the fall of the Empire, he attacked Louis XVIII as soon as he returned to the throne, and had to take the road of exile to avoid a new stay in prison. The place and date of his death, which can be located between 1819, the date of publication of his last play, and 1833, the year in which his wife Marie-Anne Cayla was designated as "Lacombe widow" in the settlement of his estate at Figeac, remain unknown.

Chateauvieux is a trisaïeul of naturalist and ethnographer Léon de Cessac (1841-1891).

== Works ==
Theatre

- 1797: L'Assemblée électorale à Cythère, interlude in one act, at the Théâtre du Palais-Royal (22 April)
- 1799: Maria, ou la Folie de Limberg, 3-act drama, with Hector Chaussier, at the Théâtre de l'Ambigu-Comique (27 June)
- 1799: La Nouvelle Pupille, allegorical bluette in 1 act, with Hector Chaussier and Armand Croizette, at Théâtre de la Gaîté (19 November)
- 1800: Un trait d'Helvétius, comedy in one act, mingled with vaudevilles, with P.G.A. Bonel and Hector Chaussier, at Théâtre Molière (4 October)
- 1801: Le Masque tombé, ou le Bal de l'Opéra, comedy in one act, mingled with vaudevilles, with Armand Croizette and P.G.A. Bonel, at Théâtre Molière (10 January)
- 1802: Les Aveugles de Franconville, 1-act opera, with Armand Croizette, music by Louis-Sébastien Lebrun, at Théâtre Montansier (29 April)
- 1817: La Pièce en perce, one-act comedy, mingled with vaudevilles, with Edmond Crosnier and Armand Croizette, at Théâtre de l'Ambigu-Comique (19 June). Printed in 1819 at Fages in Paris.

Varia

- 1814: Le Retour au bonheur, 1 volume in-12, Paris, De Bray
- 1815: L'Ambition de Napoléon Ier dévoilée, 1 volume in-8, Paris, at the author
- 1815: Lettre à Louis XVIII, sur son séjour à Paris, 1 volume in-4, Strasbourg, Levrault printing house
- 1815: Honneur et Patrie : Vive Louis XVIII !, 1 volume in-8, Rouen, Ferrand son printing house

== Bibliography ==
- Joseph-Marie Quérard, Les supercheries littéraires dévoilées, in 5 volumes, Paris, published by the author, 1845–1856.
- Joseph-Marie Quérard, La France littéraire, ou Dictionnaire bibliographique des savants, historiens et gens de lettres de la France, en 14 volumes, Paris, Firmin-Didot, 1826–1842.
- Defence Historical Service (S. H. D.) of Brest. Registers of the Brest Prison (sous-série 2 O, côte 2 O 20 à 2 O 32).
