= Hippolyte Hostein =

French playwright, theatre director and theatre manager

- Born: 14 October 1814; Paris, France
- Died: 8 September 1879 (aged 64); Paris, France
- Occupations: Playwright; theatre director; theatre manager

Hippolyte Hostein (14 September 1814 – 8 September 1879) was a French playwright, theatre director and theatre manager.

== Biography ==
Boen in Paris, he successively directed the Théâtre Historique (1847-1850), the Théâtre de la Gaité (1849-1858), the Cirque-Olympique (1858-1862), the Théâtre du Châtelet (1862-1864/1865-1869), the Théâtre du Château-d'eau (1868-1869), the Théâtre de la Renaissance (1873-1875) and the Théâtre de l'Ambigu-Comique (1875). He also published cronicles in Le Figaro and Le Constitutionnel

== Works ==
Theatre

- Le Miracle des roses, drama in sixteen scenes, with Antony Béraud, 1844
- Les Sept Ans de S. A. Mgr le Prince impérial, cantata on a music by Adolphe de Groot, premiered at the Théâtre du Châtelet 16 March 1863
- L'Affaire Lerouge, drama in five acts and eight scenes after Émile Gaboriau, premiered at the Théâtre du Château-d'eau 2 May 1872

Texts

- 1843: Les Contes bleus de ma nourrice, A. Desesserts, Paris
- 1848: Réforme théâtrale suivie d'Esquisse d'un projet de loi sur les théâtres, A. Desesserts
- 1867: La Liberté des théâtres, Librairie des auteurs, Paris
- 1878: Historiettes et souvenirs d'un homme de théâtre, E. Dentu, Paris

== Bibliography ==
- Philippe Chauveau, Les Théâtres parisiens disparus (1402-1986), Ed. de l'Amandier, Paris, 1999 ISBN 2-907649-30-2
