= Henri-François Dumolard =

French playwright (1771–1845)

- Born: Henri-François Élisabeth Étienne Dumolard-Orcel; Paris
- Died: 21 December 1845 (aged 74); Paris
- Occupation: Playwright

Henri-François Élisabeth Étienne Dumolard-Orcel, better known as Henri-François Dumolard (2 October 1771 – 21 December 1845) was an early 19th-century French playwright.

The son of a judge, he lost his father aged fifteen and in order to make a living, to go to school and to help his mother, accepted a position of copyist. He became secretary general of the police administration (1789-1790) and a lawyer (1796). A member of the "Société académique des sciences" and a controller of the Public Treasury (1796-1813), his plays were presented on the most important Parisian stages of his time, including the Théâtre du Vaudeville, the Théâtre des Variétés, and the Théâtre de la Porte-Saint-Martin.

== Works ==
- 1803: Le Philinte de Destouches, ou la Suite du Glorieux , five-act comedy, in verse
- 1804: Une heure d'Alcibiade, opéra comique in 1 act and in free verse
- 1804: Le Mari instituteur, ou les Nouveaux époux, one-act comedy, in verse
- 1804: Vincent de Paul, three-act drama, in verse
- 1805: La Mort de Jeanne d'Arc, three-act tragedy
- 1806: Henri IV à Saint-Denis, fragment imitated from the poem entitled L'Apothéose de Henri le Grand, by Jean Prévost
- 1807: Madame Favart, comédie en 1 acte en prose, mêlée de vaudevilles, avec Charles-François-Jean-Baptiste Moreau de Commagny
- 1808: Les Avant-postes du maréchal de Saxe, comedy in 1 act and in prose, mingled with comédie en vaudevilles, with Commagny
- 1808: Bon Naturel et Vanité ou la Petite École des femmes, comedy in 1 act and in verse
- 1809: Le Rival par amitié, comedy in 1 act and in prose, mingled with comédies en vaudeville, with Antoine-Pierre-Charles Favart
- 1809: Un tour de Colalto, comédie en 1 acte, en prose, mingled with vaudevilles, with Commagny
- 1810: Le Secret de Madame, one-act comedy, mingled with vaudevilles
- 1811: L'Exil de Rochester ou La taverne, comédie anecdotique in 1 act, in prose, mingled with vaudevilles, with Commagny
- 1811: Les Expédients, one-act comedy, in prose, mingled with vaudevilles
- 1811: Fénelon au tombeau de Rotrou, poem which contributed to the poetry prize awarded by the second class of the Institut de France
- 1812: Le Roman d'un jour, comedie in 1 act and in prose, mingled with vaudevilles
- 1813: Callot à Nancy, comédie anecdotique in 1 act, in prose and in vaudevilles
- 1814: La Vieillesse de Fontenelle, comédie-anecdote in 1 act, in vaudevilles, with Pierre Capelle
- 1834: Catherine II et Pierre III, five-act tragedy
- 1834: Une journée de la ligue, three-act tragedy
- 1845: Entretiens de l'autre monde, memoirs

== Biography ==
- Dictionnaire de la conversation et de la lecture, t. LIX, 1846, (p. 272-274)
- Joseph-Marie Quérard, Félix Bourquelot, Charles Louandre, La littérature française contemporaine. XIXe siècle, 1854, (p. 558)
- Ludovic Lalanne, Dictionnaire historique de la France, 1872, (p. 679)
- Pierre Larousse, Nouveau Larousse illustré: dictionnaire universel, 1898, (p. 877)
