= Eugène Hyacinthe Laffillard =

French playwright and chansonnier (1779–1846)

- Born: 17 June 1778; Paris
- Died: 5 January 1846 (aged 67); Vaugirard (15th arrondissement of Paris)
- Occupations: Playwright, chansonnier

Eugène Hyacinthe Laffillard (17 June 1779 – 5 January 1846) was a 19th-century French playwright and chansonnier.

A president of the Caveau Moderne in 1839, he participated to numerous literary publications such as the Courrier des Théâtres, La Nouveauté, the Observateur, the Voleur and La France littéraire.

He wrote many vaudevilles under his name or the pen name Eugène Décour. His plays were presented on the most important Parisian stages of the 19th century: Théâtre du Vaudeville, Théâtre de la Gaîté, Théâtre du Panthéon, Théâtre de l'Ambigu-Comique, Théâtre des Variétés etc.

== Works ==
- 1802: L'Amour au village, opéra-vaudeville in 1 act
- 1802: Elina et Natalie, ou les Hongrois, drama in 3 acts, translated by Kotzebue
- 1803: La Sifflomanie, folie-vaudeville in 1 act and in prose, with Grétry
- 1804: Le Hameau de Chantilly ou Le Retour, folie-vaudeville in 1 act
- 1805: Un peu de méchanceté, comedy in 1 act and in verses, with André-Joseph Grétry
- 1806: Jacques Callot à Nancy, historical comedy in 1 act mingled with couplets
- 1806: Dix mille francs à gagner ou La fille perdue, arlequinade-vaudeville in 1 act
- 1806: Collin d'Harleville aux Champs-Élysées, comédie-vaudeville in 1 act, with Joseph Aude
- 1806: Le Mariage en poste, comedy in 1 act and in prose
- 1806: La Paix, impromptu vaudeville, with Aude
- 1807: Les Petits ricochets, imitation in 1 act and in comédie en vaudevilles, with Aude
- 1807: Arlequin sourd-muet, ou Cassandre opérateur, arlequinade en vaudeville, with Aude
- 1808: Mercure à Paris, arlequinade in 1 act, with Aude
- 1808: La Veille d'une grande fête, homage in 1 act and in verses, mingled with couplets, with Aude
- 1810: Épître à Désaugiers, l'un des convives du Caveau moderne
- 1813: Le Mannequin parlant, ou le Portrait de Dominique, arlequinade in 1 act, mingled with couplets, with Rochefort
- 1817: La Famille des Sans-Gêne ou Les amis du Château, tableau vivant in 1 act
- 1819: L'épée de Jeanne d'Arc, à propos burlesque et grivois in 1 act
- 1821: Jodelle ou Le berceau du théâtre, comédie-vaudeville in 1 act, with Edmond Rochefort and Hubert
- 1821: Le Dîner d'emprunt, ou les Gants et l'épaulette, vaudeville in 1 act, with Hubert
- 1822: Le Coq de village, tableau-vaudeville in 1 act, by Charles Simon Favart, revived in Theatre with changes, with Charles Hubert and Théodore Anne
- 1823: Les Mariages écossais, vaudeville in 1 act, with Jean-Baptiste Pellissier
- 1823: Les Précautions de ma tante, vaudeville in 1 act, with Hubert
- 1823: Les Petits maraudeurs, ou les Tambours en goguettes, tableau in 1 act mingled with vaudevilles, with Étienne-Junien de Champeaux and Gombault
- 1824: L'étourdi à la diète
- 1825: Les Sœurs de lait, scènes morales, mingled with couplets, with Alexandre Tardif and Gombault
- 1825: Le Couronnement au village, ou la Route de Reims, à propos mingled with couplets, with Paul Auguste Gombault
- 1825: Croisée à louer, ou Un jour à Reims, tableau mingled with vaudevilles, with Gombault
- 1825: Le Petit marchand, ou Chacun son commerce, vaudeville in 1 act, with Gombault and Auguste Imbert
- 1826: Le Béarnais, ou l'Enfance de Henri IV, with Jacques-André Jacquelin
- 1826: Monsieur et Madame, ou les Morts pour rire, folie-vaudeville in 1 act, with Pellissier
- 1826: La Saint-Charles au collège, with Jacques-André Jacquelin
- 1827: Les Acteurs par hasard, ou la Comédie au jardin, comedy in 1 act and in prose
- 1827: La petite somnambule ou Coquetterie et gourmandise, vaudeville in 3 tableaux, with Gomault
- 1828: La Muette des Pyrénées, play in 2 tableaux and in prose, mingled with couplets
- 1829: Finette, ou l'Adroite princesse, folie-féerie mingled with couplets, after tales by Charles Perrault, with Jules Dulong and Gombault
- 1831: M. Mayeux, ou Le Bossu à la mode, à propos de bosses in 3 tableaux, mingled with vaudevilles, with Emmanuel Lepeintre and Amable de Saint-Hilaire
- 1832: Caméloni, ou Je me venge, comedy in 1 act and in verses, with Gustave Dalby
- 1833: La Citadelle d'Anvers, ou le Séjour et la conquête, à propos in 2 acts, mingled with couplets
- 1833: Le Savetier et l'apothicaire, folie-vaudeville, in 1 act and extravaganza, with Pierre-Joseph Charrin and Pierre Tournemine
- 1833: Le Gamin, folie-vaudeville in 3 acts, with Lubize
- 1835: Trois femmes, ou les Bonnes amies, vaudeville in 1 act, with Tradif and Tourret
- 1836: M. Bontemps, ou la Belle-mère et la bru, comedy in 1 act, mingled with couplets, with Gaspard Tourret
- 1836: Orgueil et ignorance, comédie-vaudeville in 1 act
- 1841: Au comte de Paris. Les Baptêmes

== Bibliography ==
- Jean Marie Querard, Les supercheries littéraires dévoilées, 1853, p. 208
- Georges d'Heylli, Dictionnaire des pseudonymes, 1869
