= Pierre Capelle =

French chansonnier, goguettier and writer (1775–1851)

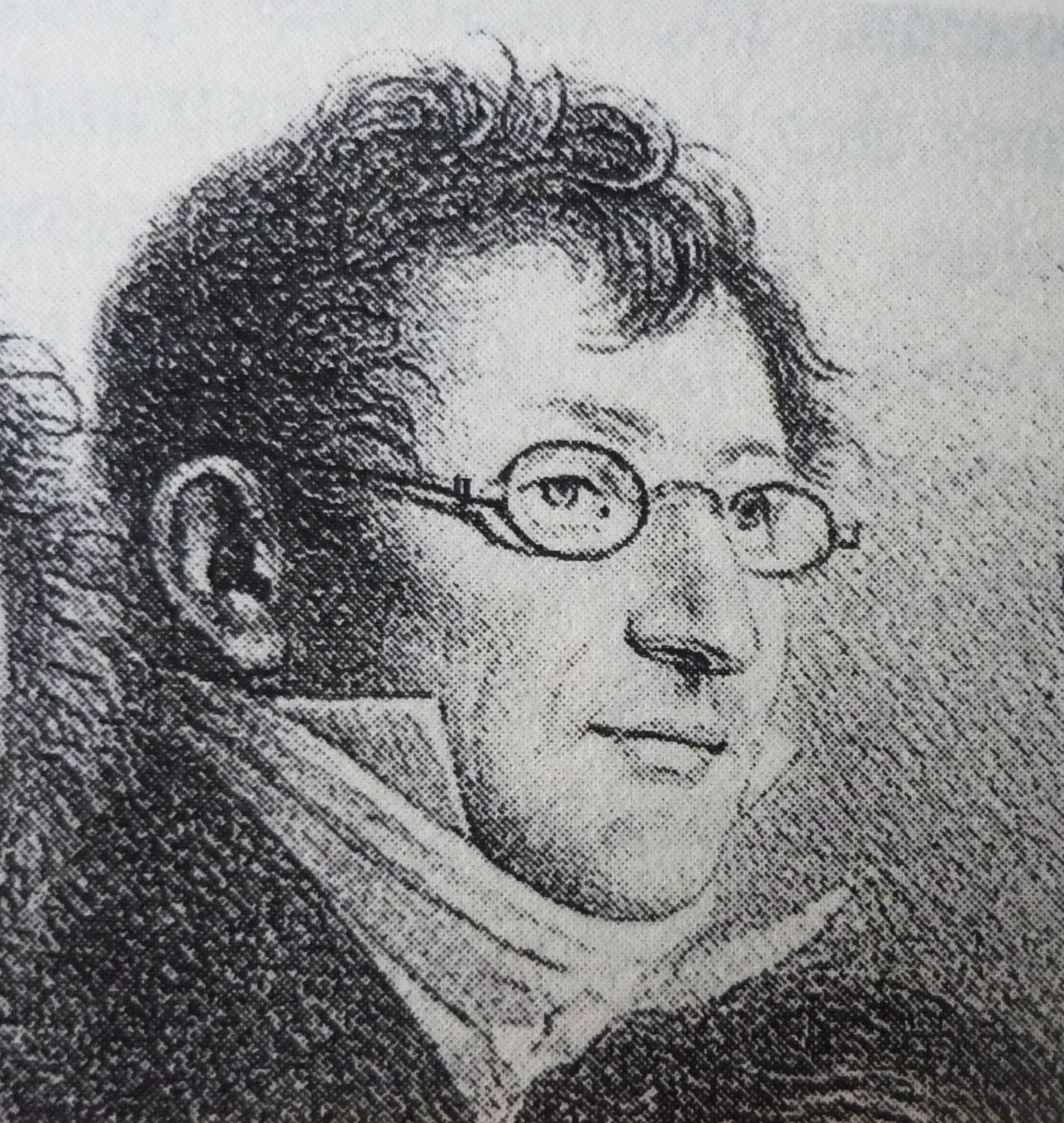
- Pierre Capelle
- Born: Pierre Adolphe Capelle; 4 November 1775; Montauban, Quercy, Kingdom of France
- Died: 4 October 1851 (aged 75); Paris
- Occupations: Chansonnier; Writer

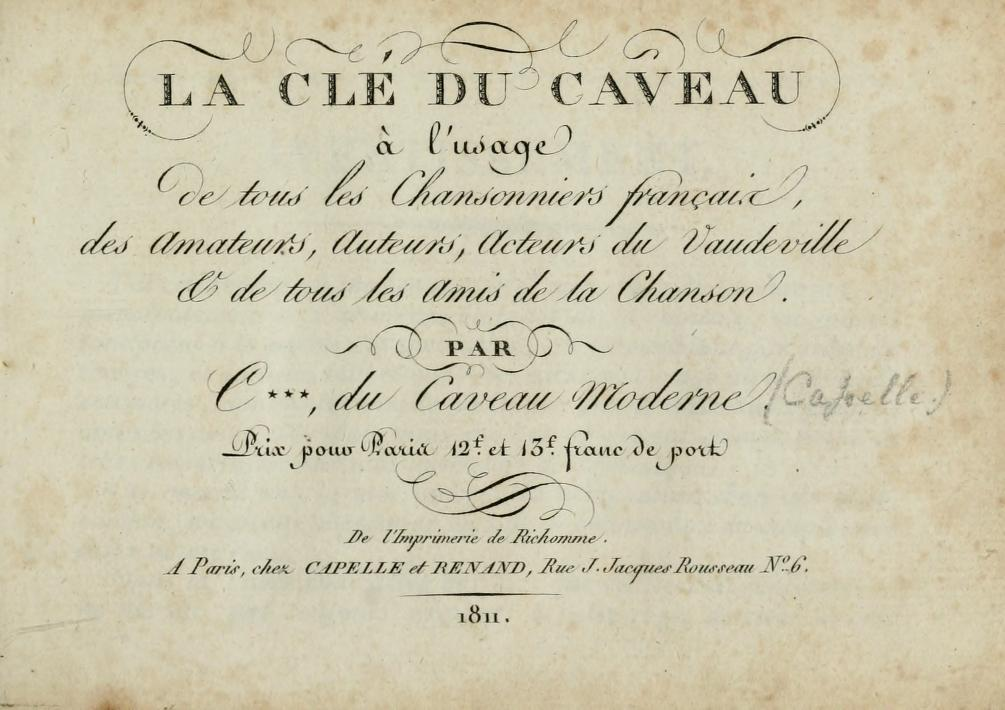
La clé du Caveau, recueil de timbres published by Pierre Capelle in 1811.

Pierre Adolphe Capelle (4 November 1775 – 4 October 1851) was a 19th-century French chansonnier, goguettier and writer.

== Works ==
First a chansonnier, he also composed many comédies en vaudeville as well as texts of circumstances :

- 1797: Bébée et Jargon, one-act rhapsody, in prose, mingled with couplets
- 1801–1802: Âneries révolutionnaires, ou Balourdisiana, bêtisiana, etc. etc. ect
- 1813: Elle et lui, one-act comedy mingled with vaudevilles, with Théaulon
- 1814: La Vieillesse de Fontenelle, one-act comédie-anecdote, with Henri-François Dumolard
- 1816: Gascon et Normand, ou les Deux soubrettes, one-act comedy, mingled with vaudevilles, with Emmanuel Théaulon
- 1816: La journée aux aventures, three-act opéra comique, in prose
- 1817: Les deux Gaspard, one-act comédie en vaudeville
- 1817: La Fête de la reconnaissance, impromptu in vaudevilles, with Nicolas Brazier
- 1818: Encore une folie ou La veille du mariage, one-act comédie en vaudeville, with Gabriel de Lurieu
- 1818: Contes, anecdotes, chansons et poésies diverses
- 1811: La Clef du Caveau
- 1820: L'Autre Henri, ou l'An 1880, comedy in 3 acts, in prose, with Théaulon and Fulgence de Bury
- 1820: L'Ermite de Saint-Avelle, ou le Berceau mystérieux, one-act vaudeville, with Théaulon
- 1822: Chanson de la berceuse du duc de Bordeaux
- 1824: Dictionnaire de morale, de science et de littérature, ou Choix de pensées ingénieuses et sublimes, de dissertations et de définitions
- 1824: Le Tambour de Logrono, ou Jeunesse et valeur, one-act historical tableau, mingled with couplets, with Paul Auguste Gombault
- 1826: Manuel de la typographie française
- 1826: La Veuve de quinze ans, one-act comédie en vaudeville, with Théaulon
- Chansonnier des Muses
- 1834: Abrégé de l'histoire de Paris
- 1850: L'Amitié, discours en vers libres
- undated: Le 6 juin 1825. Rentrée de Charles X dans sa capitale après la cérémonie du sacre
- undated: A-Propos sur le rétablissement du trône des Bourbons en France
- undated: Couplets adressés par un grenadier de la Grande Armée à ses camarades
- undated: Discours de Jérôme Farine, membre honoraire de la Société des forts de la Halle, à ses camarades et aux bouquetières de la rue aux Fers, réunis à la Courtille
- undated: Ma profession de foi épicurienne, ronde de table
- undated: Physiologie de la noce, ou C'est toujours la même chanson
- undated: Tout roule dans ce monde

== Bibliography ==
- Claude Duneton, Emmanuelle Bigot, Histoire de la chanson française: De 1780 à 1860, 1998, p. 214, 273
- Paul Mironneau, Chansonnier Henri IV, 1999
