= Auguste Imbert =

French playwright, publisher and author (1791–1840)

Jean-Baptiste Auguste Imbert (3 March 1791, in Paris – 1840, in Brussels) was a 19th-century French playwright, bookseller, publisher, historian, chansonnier and journalist.

== Biography ==
He first worked in various jurisdictions before being named secretary in November 1816 of the Joint Committee established near the Prussian army in France.

After the departure of the Allies, he became a bookseller in Paris and also published under the pseudonyms "De Saint-Eugène", "Rossignol", "Passe-Partout" or simply "Auguste". On 4 January 1827, he was sentenced to a 595 francs fine and costs by the Criminal Court of the Seine department for defamation and incitement to hatred and contempt to King's government for his work Biographie des imprimeurs et des libraires. All the same, he had trouble with the law for his book Mon rêve, ou le gouvernement des animaux (1828). Banished, he moved to Brussels where he ended his life.

Moreover, Imbert was editor in different literary journals such as le Corsaire et La Lorgnette and published a great number of songs, among others in the Almanach des Grâces, the Almanach des Muses and the Veillées françaises.

His plays were presented on the most important Parisian stages of the 19th century, including the Théâtre de la Porte Saint-Martin and the Théâtre de l'Odéon.

== Works ==
- 1814: Traits remarquables du règne de Napoléon
- 1817: La Dinde en pal ou un Trait d'Henri IV, historical comedy mingled with couplets
- 1818: Réflexions sur le prisonnier de Rouen ou Histoire du soi-disant faux dauphin
- 1818: Les Veillées d'une captive, with Antony Béraud and Louis-François L'Héritier
- 1820: La Sœur Anne, ou le Billet à payer, one-act intermède, mingled with couplets
- 1821: La petite somnambule, one-act comedy lacrina-comique, mingled with couplets
- 1822: Fanfan Ducroquet, sortant de la 1re représentation de Azéma, ou le Père meurtrier de sa fille , pantomime
- 1823: Émélie, ou la Petite glaneuse, drama by Berquin, arranged on one act and set in vaudeville
- 1824: Voyage autour du Pont-Neuf, et promenade sur le quai aux Fleurs
- 1824: La Chaumière du vieux soldat, song
- 1825: Azéma, ou l'Infanticide, roman historique tiré des causes célèbres de l'Angleterre, 2 vol.
- 1825: L'Enfant des tours Notre-Dame, ou Ma vie de garçon, historical novel
- 1825: Petit Berquin en miniature; théâtre d'éducation pour le premier âge
- 1825: L'Étude du cœur, ou les Leçons paternelles, novel
- 1826: Biographie des imprimeurs et des libraires, précédée d'un coup d'œil sur la librairie
- 1827: Biographie des condamnés pour délits politiques, with Benjamin-Louis Bellet
- 1827: Le Petit marchand, ou Chacun son commerce, one-act vaudeville, from a tale by Ducray-Duménil, with Paul Auguste Gombault and Eugène Hyacinthe Laffillard
- 1828: Les Deux Amis, two-act vaudeville
- 1828: La Mystification ou Le Comité de lecture, one-act comedy
- 1828: Mon rêve, ou le gouvernement des animaux
- 1828: Tablettes bruxelloises, ou Usages, mœurs et coutumes de Bruxelles, with Bellet
- 1830: La Bobineautiade, ou Coup-d'œil critique sur le théâtre du Luxembourg, satire en 2 chants
- 1830: Histoire de la révolution des quatre-vingt-seize heures, de ses causes et de ses effets; suivie des Traits de bravoure, de patriotisme, de dévouement, d'humanité et de désintéressement, qui ont eu lieu pendant les mémorables journées des 26, 27, 28 et 29 juillet 1830
- 1831: Le Bâtard d'une haute et puissante dame, 2 volumes
- 1833: L'Écu de cinq francs, capilotade
- 1838: Le Démérite des femmes

== Bibliography ==
- Auguste Joseph de Reume, Notices bio-bibliographiques sur quelques imprimeurs, 1858, (p. 29) (read online)
- Joseph-Marie Quérard, Les supercheries littéraires dévoilées, 1869, (p. 395)
