= Emmanuel Lepeintre =

French actor and playwright (1790–1847)

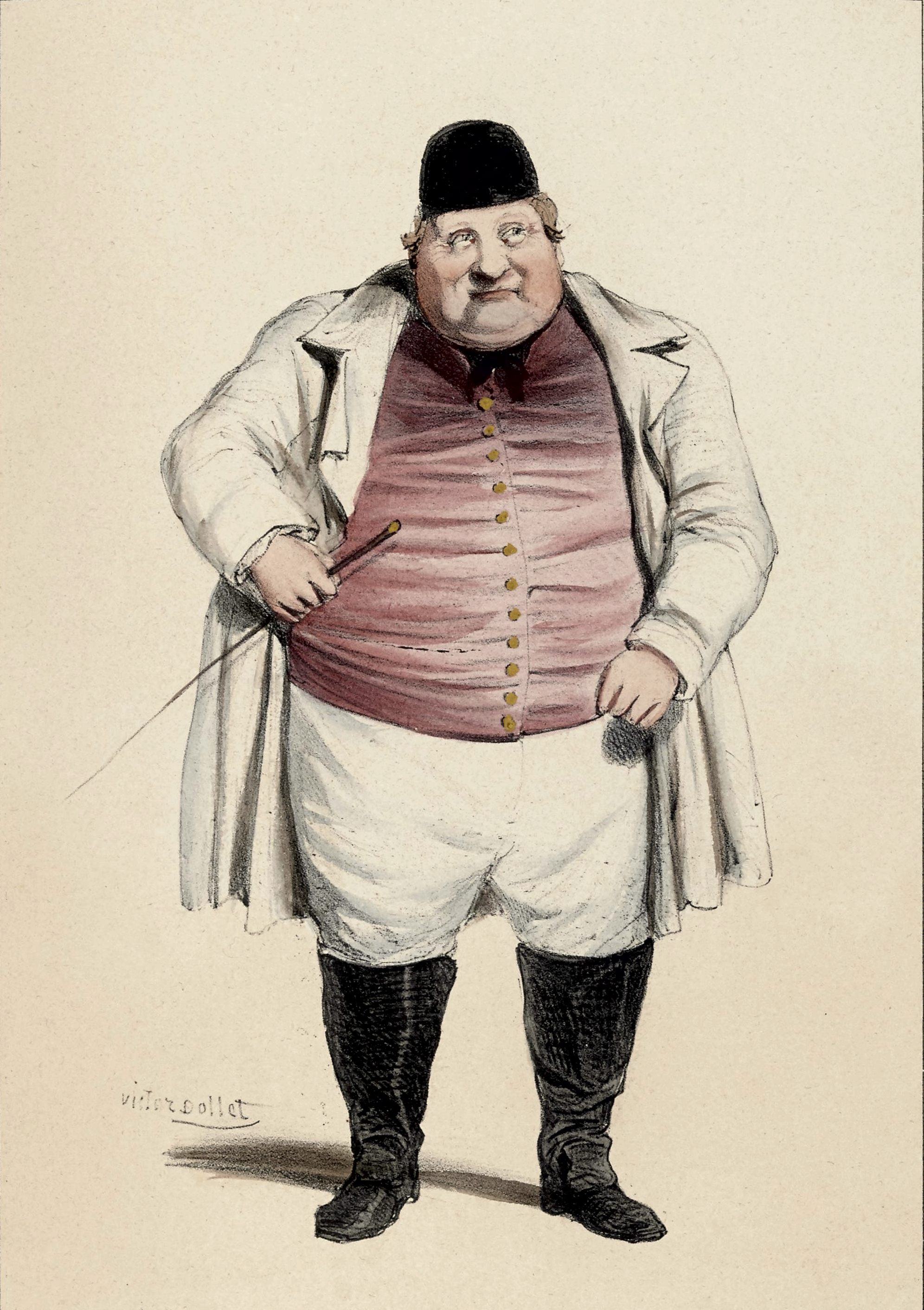
- Born: Emmanuel Augustin Lepeintre; 22 September 1790; Versailles
- Died: 24 February 1847 (aged 56); Paris
- Occupations: Actor, chansonnier, dramatist

Emmanuel Lepeintre, real name Emmanuel Augustin Lepeintre called Lepeintre jeune or Lepeintre Cadet, (22 September 1790 – 24 February 1847) was a French stage actor, chansonnier and playwright.

== Biographie ==
He began his acting career aged ten at the Théâtre des Jeunes-Artistes in the role of Cassandra in Hasard corrigé par l'amour, a vaudeville by Philidor Rochelle.

A comic actor at the Théâtre des Variétés and at the Théâtre du Vaudeville from 1818 to 1843, he played the role of Dugazon in Le duel et le déjeuner ou Les comédiens joués by Mélesville (1818) and also that of Hamelin in La famille improvisée by Nicolas Brazier (1840). He was famous for his obesity and his bons mots.

== Works ==
- 1814: La fête de famille, opéra-vaudeville, impromptu, in 1 act and free verse
- 1820: Le Cirque Bojolay, ou Pleuvra-t-il ? ne pleuvra-t-il pas ?, à propos-parodie-vaudeville in 1 act
- 1820: Écoutons ! ! !, scènes improvisées, à l'occasion de la naissance de S. A. R. Mgr le duc de Bordeaux, with Amable de Saint-Hilaire
- 1831: M. Mayeux, ou Le Bossu à la mode, à propos de bosses en 3 tableaux, mêlé de vaudevilles, with Saint-Hilaire and Eugène Hyacinthe Laffillard
- 1833: La Citadelle d'Anvers, ou le Séjour et la conquête, à-propos en 2 actes, mingled with couplets
- 1840: Insomnies de Lepeintre jeune le fracturé, mises au jour, la nuit, par lui et ses deux gardes-malade
- 1840: Loisirs d'une convalescence, bêtises de Lepeintre jeune
- 1840: Pot-pourri, à propos de la première et dernière représentation de Vautrin
- 1843: Physiologie du parrain
- 1848: Œuvres badines et posthumes de Lepeintre jeune, songs, parodies, jokes and puns

== Bibliography ==
- J. Hippolyte Daniel, Biographie des hommes remarquables de Seine-et-Oise, 1837, (p. 77-78) (Lire en ligne)
- Pierre Larousse, Grand dictionnaire universel du XIXe siècle, 1873
- Henry Lyonnet, Dictionnaire des comédiens français, 1911, (p. 355)
