= Paul Auguste Gombault =

Paul Auguste Gombault (21 January 1786 in Orléans – 1853) was a 19th-century French playwright.

His plays were presented at the Théâtre Comte, the Théâtre des Délassements-Comiques and the Théâtre de la Gaîté.

== Works ==
- 1806: La Revue des Gobe-Mouches, ou, les visites du jour de l'an, one-act folie-épisodique, in vaudevilles, with Alexandre Fursy
- 1816: Le Soldat d'Henri IV, one-act play, mingled with vaudevilles
- 1823: Le Petit chaperon rouge, conte en action mingled with couplets, with Étienne-Junien de Champeaux
- 1823: Le Petit clerc, one-act comédie en vaudeville, with Charles-Maurice Descombes
- 1824: Les Sœurs de lait, scènes morales, mingled with couplets, with Eugène Hyacinthe Laffillard
- 1824: Le Tambour de Logrono, ou Jeunesse et valeur, one-act historical tableau, mingled with couplets, with Pierre Capelle
- 1825: Le Couronnement au village, ou la Route de Reims, à propos mingled with couplets, with Laffillard
- 1825: Croisée à louer, ou Un jour à Reims, tableau mingled with vaudevilles, with Laffillard
- 1827: Finette, ou l'Adroite princesse, folie-féerie mingled with couplets, after the contes de Perrault, with Laffillard and Jules Dulong
- 1827: La Petite somnambule ou Coquetterie et gourmandise, vaudeville in 3 tableaux, with Laffillard
- 1827: Le Petit marchand, ou Chacun son commerce, vaudeville in 1 act, from a tale by Ducray-Duménil, with Auguste Imbert and Laffillard
- 1829: Un Jour d'audience, vaudeville en 1 acte, imitated from the Tales of Bouilly
- 1830: Les Deux Mousses, drama in three tableaux, mingled with song and dance, extravaganza, with Maurice Alhoy
- 1830: Napoléon à Brienne, pronostic, mingled with couplets
- 1851: Le Père Joseph, three-act comedy, mingled with couplets

== Bibliography ==
- Joseph-Marie Quérard, La France littéraire ou Dictionnaire bibliographique des savants..., 1829, p. 405 (read online)
