= Châteauvieux-les-Fossés =

- Commune
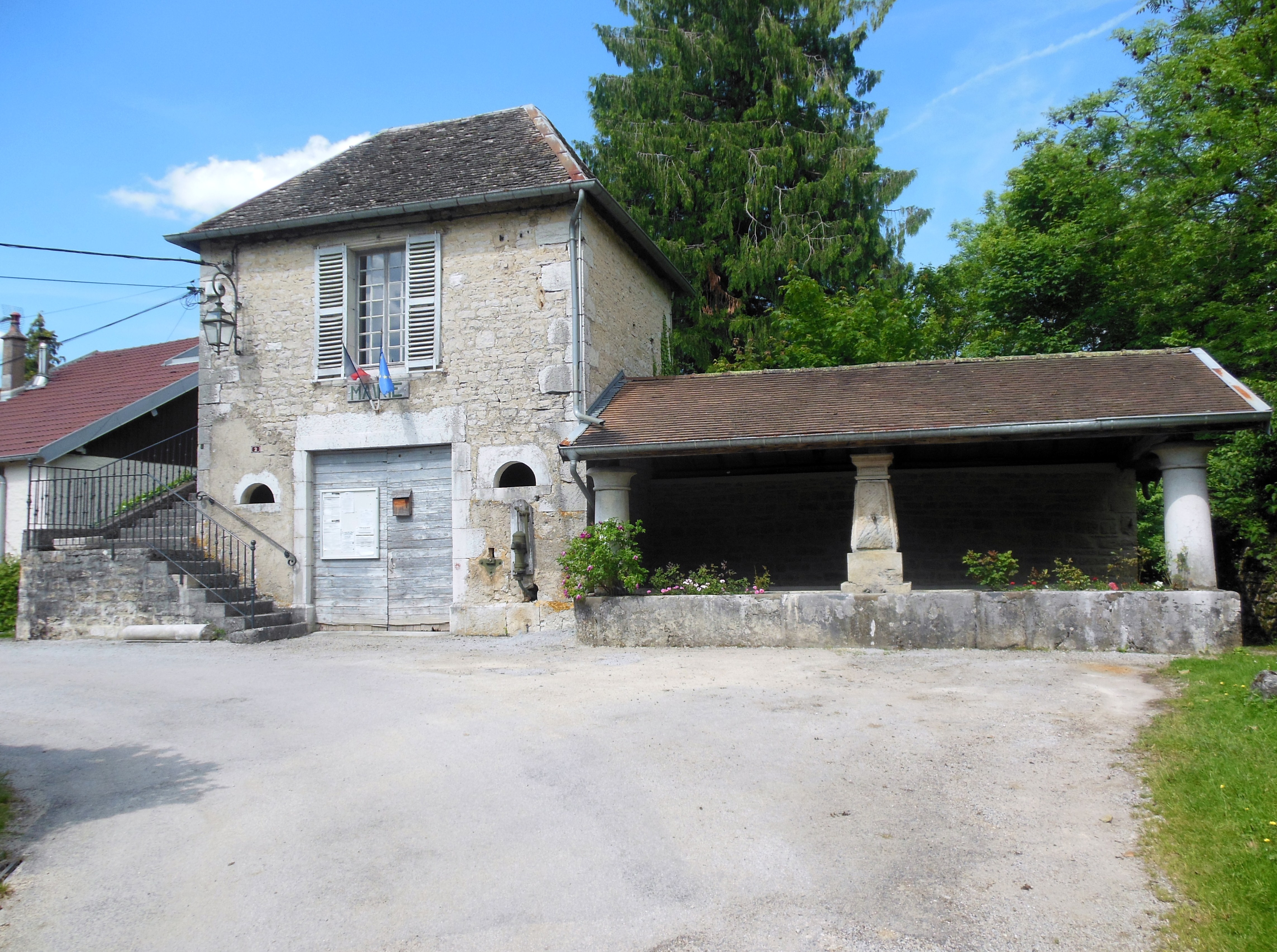
- Town hall
- Location of Châteauvieux-les-Fossés
- Location within France Location within Bourgogne-Franche-Comté
- Coordinates: 47°03′54″N 6°12′10″E
- Country: France
- Region: Bourgogne-Franche-Comté
- Department: Doubs
- Arrondissement: Besançon
- Canton: Ornans
- Intercommunality: Loue-Lison

Government
  - Mayor (2020–2026): Danièle Fiétier
- Area^{1}: 4.46 km^{2} (1.72 sq mi)
- Highest elevation: 715 m (2,346 ft)
- Lowest elevation: 347 m (1,138 ft)
- Population (2023): 9
  - Density: 2.0/km^{2} (5.2/sq mi)
- Time zone: UTC+01:00 (CET)
  - Summer (DST): UTC+02:00 (CEST)
- INSEE/Postal code: 25130 /25840
- ^{1} French Land Register data, which excludes lakes, ponds, glaciers > 1 km^{2} (0.386 sq mi or 247 acres) and river estuaries.

Châteauvieux-les-Fossés (French pronunciation: [ʃɑtovjø le fɔse]) is a commune in the Doubs department in the Bourgogne-Franche-Comté region in eastern France.

== Population ==
Historical population
Year	Pop.	±% p.a.
1968	15	—
1975	14	−0.98%
1982	14	+0.00%
1990	9	−5.37%
1999	11	+2.25%
2007	7	−5.49%
2012	13	+13.18%
2017	13	+0.00%
2023	9	−5.94%
Source: INSEE

== See also ==
- Communes of the Doubs department
