= Lisle, Loir-et-Cher =

Lisle
- Commune
- Coat of arms
- Location of Lisle
- Location within France Location within Centre-Val de Loire
- Coordinates: 47°51′14″N 1°07′01″E
- Country: France
- Region: Centre-Val de Loire
- Department: Loir-et-Cher
- Arrondissement: Vendôme
- Canton: Le Perche
- Intercommunality: Perche et Haut Vendômois

Government
  - Mayor (2020–2026): Marylène Gouet
- Area^{1}: 6.61 km^{2} (2.55 sq mi)
- Elevation: 90 m (300 ft)
- Highest elevation: 147 m (482 ft)
- Lowest elevation: 82 m (269 ft)
- Population (2023): 181
  - Density: 27.4/km^{2} (70.9/sq mi)
- Time zone: UTC+01:00 (CET)
  - Summer (DST): UTC+02:00 (CEST)
- INSEE/Postal code: 41116 /41100
- ^{1} French Land Register data, which excludes lakes, ponds, glaciers > 1 km^{2} (0.386 sq mi or 247 acres) and river estuaries.

Lisle (French pronunciation: [lil]) is a commune in the Loir-et-Cher department of central France.

== Population ==
Historical population
Year	Pop.	±% p.a.
1968	146	—
1975	125	−2.19%
1982	157	+3.31%
1990	191	+2.48%
1999	194	+0.17%
2007	217	+1.41%
2012	200	−1.62%
2017	195	−0.51%
2023	181	−1.23%
Source: INSEE

== See also ==
- Communes of the Loir-et-Cher department
