= Jean-Baptiste Pellissier =

French playwright (1788–1856)

- Born: Pierre Jean-Baptiste Pellissier de Labatut; 22 February 1788 (Labouffie, Montpezat-de-Quercy
- Died: 1 December 1856 (aged 68); Paris
- Occupations: Playwright, journalist

Jean-Baptiste Pellissier, full name Pierre Jean-Baptiste Pellissier de Labatut, (22 February 1788 – 11 December 1856) was a 19th-century French playwright and journalist.

== Biography ==
The son of a lawyer at the parliament of Bordeaux, an intendant of the marquis de Saint-Alvère at Montpezat-de-Quercy (modern Tarn-et-Garonne), he became chief editor of the Mémorial universel and an editor for the Revue encyclopédique (1819–1825). A secretary in the administration of the Opéra-Comique (1828), his plays, sometimes published under the pseudonym Laqueyrie, were presented on the most important Parisian stages of the 19th century including the Théâtre de la Gaîté, the Théâtre de l'Opéra-Comique, and the Théâtre de l'Odéon.

In the Louvre there is a plaster medallion of Pellissier by Etienne Hippolyte Maindron, dated 1853.

== Works ==
- 1822: La Leçon paternelle, comedy in 2 acts and in prose, with Desessarts d'Ambreville and Jean Edme Paccard
- 1823: La Fausse clef ou Les deux fils, melodrama in 3 acts, with Frédéric Dupetit-Méré
- 1823: Les Mariages écossais, vaudeville in 1 act
- 1823: Œuvres choisies de Desportes, Bertaut et Régnier, précédées de notices historiques et critiques sur ces poètes et suivies d'un vocabulaire, Firmin-Didot
- 1824: Le Cousin Ratine, ou le Repas de noce, folie-vaudeville in 1 act, mingled with couplets, with Hubert
- 1824: La Forêt de Bondi, ou la Fausse peur, comedy in 1 act and in prose
- 1824: Le Mulâtre et l'Africaine, melodrama in 3 acts, extravaganza, with Dupetit-Méré
- 1825: Blaisot, ou la Leçon d'amour, tableau villageois in 1 act, with Joseph Desessarts d'Ambreville
- 1826: Le Moulin des étangs, melodrama in 4 acts, with Dupetit-Méré
- 1826: Le Duel, drame lyrique in 3 acts, with Desessarts d'Ambreville
- 1826: Monsieur et Madame, ou les Morts pour rire, folie-vaudeville in 1 act, with Hubert and Eugène Hyacinthe Laffillard
- 1827: La Somnambule au Pont-aux-Choux, with Charles Hubert
- 1827: Louise, drama in 3 acts and in prose
- 1827: Nelly ou La Fille bannie, melodrama in 3 acts
- 1827: Sangarido, opéra comique in 1 act, with Eugène de Planard
- 1828: Guillaume Tell, drame lyrique in 3 acts, music by André Ernest Modeste Grétry
- 1828: La Peste de Marseille, historical melodrama in 3 acts and extravaganza, with René Charles Guilbert de Pixérécourt
- 1831: Les Deux Mirabeau, vaudeville anecdotique in 1 act
- 1831: Médicis et Machiavel, drama in 3 acts
- 1832: La Dame du Louvre, historical drama in 4 acts and in prose, music by Louis Alexandre Piccinni
- 1832: Le Soldat et le vigneron, vaudeville in 1 act
- 1834: Léonard, drama in 4 acts
- 1836: Œuvres choisies de Régnier, précédées d'une notice historique et critique sur ce poète et suivies d'un vocabulaire, Masson
- 1852: L'Abeille poétique du XIXe siècle, ou, Choix de poésies

== Bibliography ==
- Jean Marie Quérard, La France littéraire, tome 7, PEA-REZ, 1835, (p. 35)
- Jean-Pons-Guillaume Viennet, Raymond Trousson, Mémoires et journal: 1777-1867, 2006, (p. 772)
