= Gustave Drouineau =

French novelist and poet (1798–1878)

Gustave Pierre Drouineau
- Born: 22 February 1798; La Rochelle, France
- Died: 19 April 1878 (aged 80); Hospice de Lafond, Charente-Maritime, France
- Occupations: novelist, poet and playwright

Gustave Pierre Drouineau (22 February 1798 – 19 April 1878) was a 19th-century French novelist, poet and playwright.

== Biography ==
Coming from a family of doctors of La Rochelle, he moved to Paris to study law and live from poetry. In 1826 he obtained a great success with his romantic drama Rienzi which would tour Europe, experience numerous translations and may have been a source of inspiration to Richard Wagner for his opera Rienzi (1828). His plays were presented on the most important Parisian stages of his time including the Théâtre de la Porte-Saint-Martin, the Théâtre de l'Odéon, and the Théâtre de l'Ambigu-Comique.

His novel Ernest ou le travers du siècle published in 1829 by Timothée Dehay became a best-seller, inspiring even Balzac for his Illusions perdues (1837). The following novels did not experience the same success. After the death of his wife from consumption, he immersed himself in spirituality. In 1833, he founded a sect which he named neo-Christianity and stopped definitively writing in 1835. His family had then him interned at the hospice of Lafond hospice where he plunged into total oblivion and ended his life.

== Works ==
- 1823: Épître à Casimir Delavigne, sur ses ouvrages
- 1824: Épître à quelques poètes panégyristes
- 1826: Trois nuits de Napoléon, 2 vol.
- 1826: Rienzi, tribun de Rome, tragedy in 5 acts
- 1828: L'Écrivain public, drama in 3 acts, in prose, with Merville
- 1828: L'Espion, drama in 5 acts, in prose, with Louis Marie Fontan and Léon Halévy
- 1829: Ernest, ou Le travers du siècle, 5 vol.
- 1829: Le Fou, drama in 3 acts, with Antony Béraud and Alexis Decomberousse
- 1830: Lettre à M. Cauchois-Lemaire
- 1830: Françoise de Rimini, drama in 5 acts, in verses
- 1830: Le Soleil de la liberté
- 1832: Le Manuscrit vert, 2 vol.
- 1833: Les Ombrages, contes spiritualistes
- 1834: L'Ironie
- 1834: Confessions poétiques
- 1834: Le livre de beauté
- 1834: Celeste, 2 vol.
- 1834: Résignée, 2 vol.
- 1834: Pensées du ciel et de la solitude de Pierre-Justin Maurice, foreword,
- 1876: Ernest Dutouquet. Œuvres posthumes, théâtre, poésie diverses, posthumous

== Bibliography ==
- Eugène Fromentin, Émile Beltrémieux, Gustave Drouineau, 1969
- Brian Juden, Traditions orphiques et tendances mystiques dans le romantisme français, 1971, (p. 426)
- Robert Sabatier, Histoire de la poésie française, vol.5, 1977, (p. 24)
- Madeleine Ambrière, Précis de littérature française du XIXe siècle, 1990, (p. 173)
- Michel Prigent, Histoire de la France littéraire: Modernités : XIXe - XXe, 2006, (p. 595)
- James Thompson, Barbara Wright, Eugène Fromentin, 1820-1876: visions d'Algérie et d'Egypte, 2008, p. 41-42
