= Vaudeville (song) =

French satirical poem or song

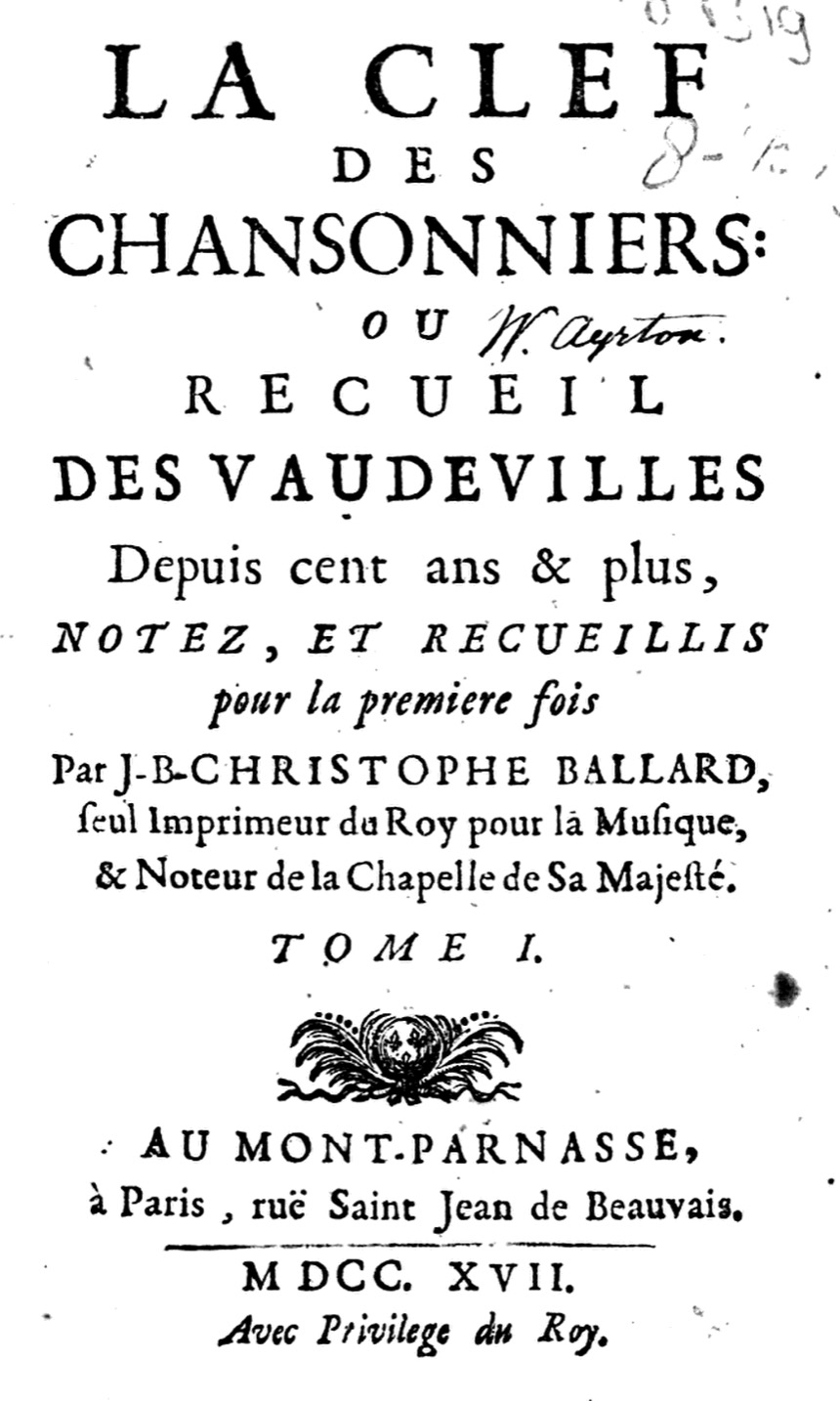
Title page of La clef des chansonniers, a 1717 collection of vaudevilles

A vaudeville (French pronunciation: [vodvil]) is a French satirical poem or song born of the 17th and 18th centuries. Its name is lent to the French theatrical entertainment comédie en vaudeville of the 19th and 20th century. From these vaudeville took its name.

The earliest vaudeville was the vau de vire, a Norman song of the 15th century, named after the valley of Vire. During the 16th century emerged a style in urban France called the voix de ville (city voice), whose name may have been a pun on vau de vire, and which was also satirical. The two styles converged and in the 17th and 18th century the term "vaudeville" came to be used for songs satirizing political and court events.

In 1717 a collection was published in Paris of over 300 vaudevilles, entitled La clef des chansonniers, ou recueil des vaudevilles depuis 100 ans et plus [The singers' key, or collection of Vaudevilles from over 100 years], and in 1733 in the same city a club, "Le Caveau", was founded devoted to singing vaudevilles.

From these popular but simple airs evolved the comédie en vaudeville, which was itself a precursor of the opéra comique.

Two vaudevilles from La clef des chansonniers

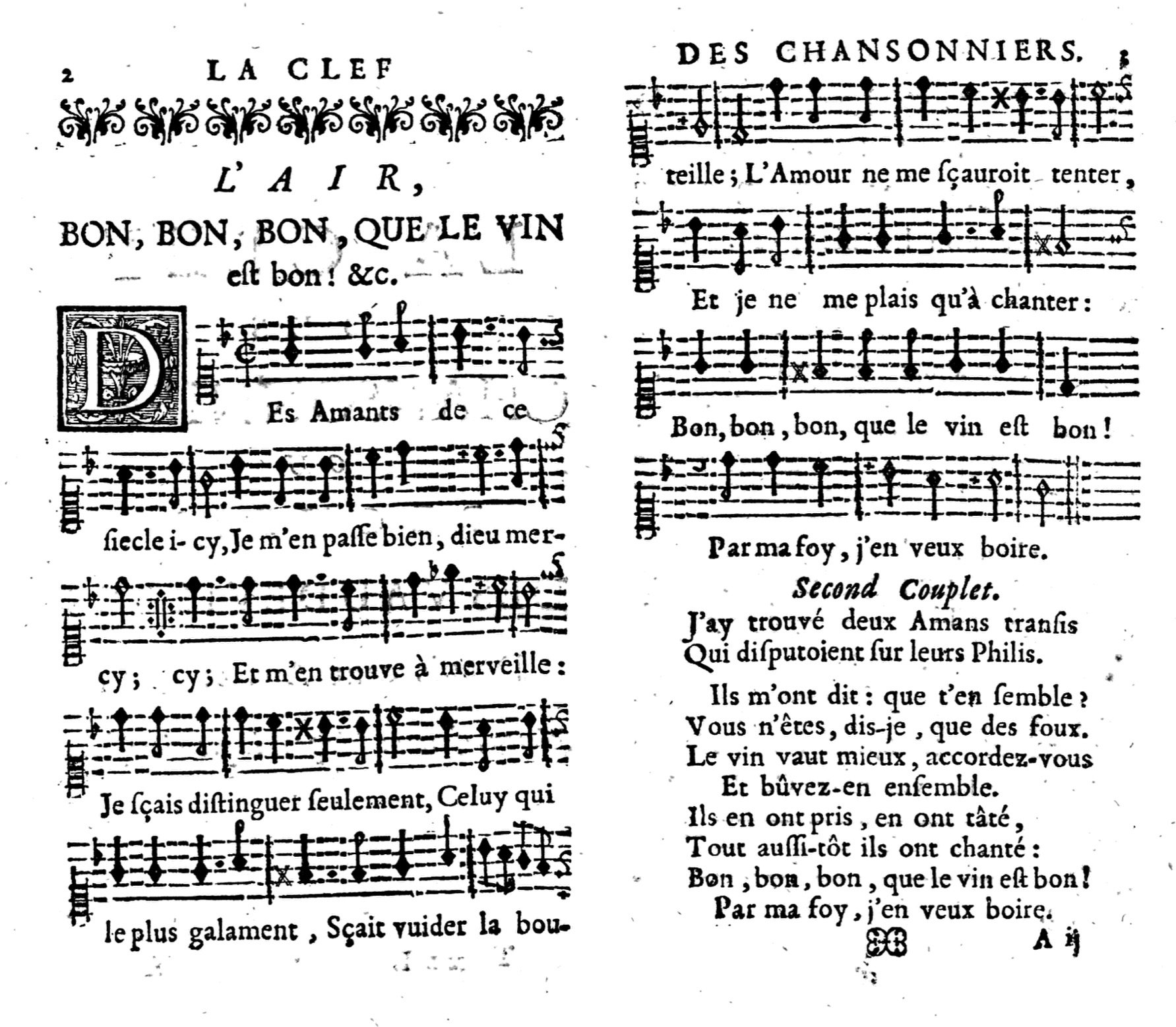
"Bon, bon, bon que le vin"

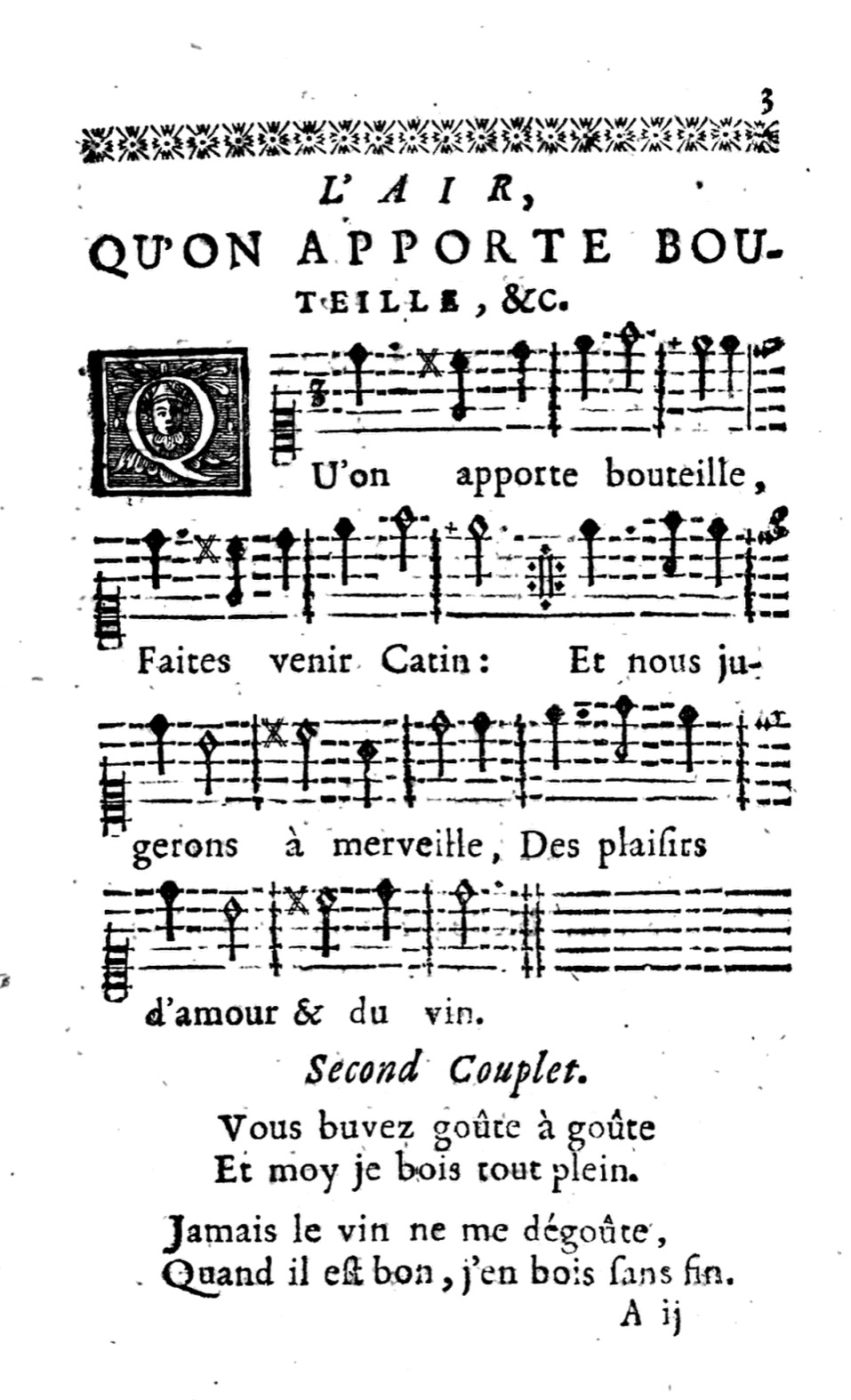
"Qu'on apporte bouteille"

== See also ==
- Grove Dictionary of Music and Musicians, Vaudeville.
