= 1979 in poetry =

Nationality words link to articles with information on the nation's poetry or literature (for instance, Irish or France).

== Events ==
- The Kenyon Review is restarted by Kenyon College in the United States 10 years after the original publication was closed.
- Jahrbuch der Lyrik ("Poetry Yearbook"), an annual poetry anthology, is launched in Germany, nine years before the similar series The Best American Poetry is begun. Each year's edition, containing 100 poems, is published in the spring by Beck, and is edited by Christoph Buchwald along with a guest editor.
- Poetry Canada Review founded by Clifton Whiten in order to publish and review poetry from across Canada; the publication folds in 1994.

== Works published in English ==
Listed by nation where the work was first published and again by the poet's native land, if different; substantially revised works listed separately:

=== Australia ===
- Robert Adamson Where I Come From
- Robert Gray, Grass script
- Jennifer Maiden, The Border Loss, Angus & Robertson
- Les Murray, The Boys Who Stole the Funeral, Angus & Robertson, 1979, 1980 and Manchester, Carcanet, 1989
- John Tranter:
  - Dazed in the Ladies Lounge, Island Press (Australia)
  - Editor, The New Australian Poetry (anthology)
- Chris Wallace-Crabbe:
  - The Emotions Are Not Skilled Workers, Sydney: Angus & Robertson
  - Toil and Spin: Two Directions in Modern Poetry (scholarship), Melbourne: Hutchinson

=== Canada ===
- Dionne Brand, Earth Magic
- Paul Dutton, Right Hemisphere, Left Ear
- Michael Ondaatje, There's a Trick with a Knife I'm Learning to Do
- Candice James, A Split in the Water. Fredericton: Fiddlehead Poetry Books.
- Irving Layton, Droppings from Heaven. Toronto: McClelland and Stewart.
- Irving Layton, The Tamed Puma. Toronto: Virgo Press.
- Irving Layton, There Were No Signs. Toronto: Madison Gallery.
- Dennis Lee.The Gods. Toronto: McClelland and Stewart.
- Steven McCaffery and B.P. Nichol, In England Now That Spring
- Susan Musgrave, A Man to Bury, A Man to Marry
- Michael Ondaatje (also see "Anthologies in Canada" section below):
  - There's a Trick with a Knife I'm Learning to Do: Poems, 1963-1978, New York: W. W. Norton (New York, NY), 1979 ISBN 0-393-01191-7, ISBN 978-0-393-01191-3 (published as Rat Jelly, and Other Poems, 1963-1978, London, United Kingdom: Marion Boyars, 1980)
  - Claude Glass (literary criticism), Toronto: Coach House Press
- Charles Sangster, Hesperus and other poems and lyrics (revised edition), edited by Frank M. Tierney (Tecumseh)
- Raymond Souster, Hanging In: New Poems. Ottawa: Oberon Press.
- James Wreford Watson, Countryside Canada.

==== Anthologies in Canada ====
- Michael Ondaatje:
  - Editor, A Book of Beasts, animal verse; Ottawa: Oberon; revision of The Broken Ark, 1971
  - Editor, The Long Poem Anthology, Toronto: Coach House ISBN 0-88910-177-9

=== India, in English ===
- K. R. Srinivasa Iyengar, Leaves from a Log: Fragments of a Journey, New Delhi: Arnold Heinemann
- Kamala Das, Old Playhouse and Other Poems ( Poetry in English ), Madras: Orient Longman
- Eunice de Souza, Fix ( Poetry in English ), Bombay: Newground, India.
- Jayanta Mahapatra, Waiting ( Poetry in English ), New Delhi: Samkaleen Prakashan
- Prabhu Siddartha Guptara, Continuations ( Poetry in English ), Calcutta: Writers Workshop
- Om Prakash Bhatnagar, Feeling Fossils

=== Ireland ===
- Harry Clifton, Office of the Salt Merchant, Oldcastle: The Gallery Press, ISBN 978-0-902996-84-7 Ireland
- Seamus Heaney, Northern Ireland poet published in the United Kingdom:
  - Field Work, Faber & Faber
  - Hedge School, Janus Press
  - Ugolino, Carpenter Press
  - Gravities, Charlotte Press
  - A Family Album, Byron Press
- Thomas Kinsella, One and Other Poems, including "Anniversaries"
- Michael Longley, The Echo Gate. Northern Ireland poet published in the United Kingdom
- Derek Mahon, Poems 1962-1978, including "A Dying Art", "Ecclesiastes", "An Image from Beckett", "Lives", "The Snow Party", "A Refusal to Mourn" and "A Disused Shed in Co. Wexford", Oxford University Press, Northern Ireland poet published in the United Kingdom

=== New Zealand ===
- Fleur Adcock (New Zealand poet who moved to England in 1963):
  - The Inner Harbour, Oxford and New York: Oxford University Press (New Zealand poet who moved to England in 1963)
  - Below Loughrigg, Newcastle upon Tyne: Bloodaxe Books
- Allen Curnow, An Incorrigible Music
- Bill Manhire, Dawn/Water
- Bob Orr, Poems for Moira

==== Anthologies ====
- John Jessop, editor, International Anthology of Concrete Poetry, vol. i
- George Swede, editor, The Canadian Haiku Anthology

=== South Africa ===
- Mazisi Kunene, Emperor Shaka the Great: a Zulu Epic

=== United Kingdom ===
- Fleur Adcock (New Zealand poet who moved to England in 1963):
  - The Inner Harbour, Oxford and New York: Oxford University Press (New Zealand poet who moved to England in 1963)
  - Below Loughrigg, Newcastle upon Tyne: Bloodaxe Books
- Kingsley Amis, Collected Poems 1944–1979
- James Berry, Fractured Circles
- Anne Born, Changing Views
- Robert Conquest, Forays
- Patric Dickinson, Our Living John, and Other Poems
- Maureen Duffy, Memorials of the Quick and the Dead
- Douglas Dunn, Barbarians
- Ketaki Kushari Dyson, Hibiscus in the North
- D. J. Enright, A Faust Book
- John Fuller, Lies and Secrets
- W. S. Graham, Collected Poems 1942–1977
- Thom Gunn, Selected Poems 1950–1975 (see also Poems 1969 in poetry, Collected Poems 1993)
- Seamus Heaney, Northern Ireland poet published in the United Kingdom:
  - Field Work, Faber & Faber
  - Hedge School, Janus Press
  - Ugolino, Carpenter Press
  - Gravities, Charlotte Press
  - A Family Album, Byron Press
- Ted Hughes:
  - Moortown
  - Remains of Elmet
- Elizabeth Jennings, Moments of Grace
- P. J. Kavanagh, Life Before Death
- Omar Khayyám, The Rubaiyat, translated by John Heath-Stubbs and Peter Avery
- Michael Longley, The Echo Gate
- Roger McGough, Holiday on Death Row
- Derek Mahon, Poems 1962-1978. Oxford University Press
- Pete Morgan, The Spring Collection
- Brian Patten, Grave Gossip
- Craig Raine, A Martian Sends a Postcard Home
- Peter Reading, Fiction

=== United States ===
- John Ashbery, As We Know
- Ted Berrigan and Harris Schiff, Yo-Yo's With Money
- Joseph Payne Brennan, Webs of Time (Macabre House)
- Maxine Chernoff, Utopia TV Store (The Yellow Press)
- Robert Creeley, Was That a Real Poem and Other Essays, edited by Donald Allen (Bolinas, California), criticism
- Federico García Lorca (posthumous), translated by Paul Blackburn, Lorca/Blackburn: Poems of Federico García Lorca Chosen by Paul Blackburn
- John Hollander, Blue Wine
- Paul Hoover, Letter to Einstein Beginning Dear Albert (The Yellow Press)
- Stanley Kunitz, The Poems of Stanley Kunitz
- Denise Levertov, Collected Earlier Poems
- Gary Miranda, Listeners at the Breathing Place
- F. A. Nettelbeck, Bug Death
- Mary Oliver, Sleeping in the Forest (chapbook)
- George Quasha, Giving the Lily Back Her Hands (Station Hill Press)
- Frank Stanford, You, posthumous chapbook (Lost Roads Publishers)
- Robert Penn Warren, Brother to Dragons

== Works published in other languages ==
Listed by language and often by nation where the work was first published and again by the poet's native land, if different; substantially revised works listed separately:

=== Denmark ===
- Inger Christensen, Brev i April ("Letter in April")
- Klaus Høeck, Denmark:
  - Dylan Forever, publisher: Swing
  - Winterreise, publisher: Gyldendal
- Henrik Nordbrandt, Spøgelseslege

=== French ===
==== Canada, in French ====
- Jean Royer, Les heures nues, Montréal: Nouvelles Éditions de l'Arc
- Marie Uguay Signe et rumeur

==== France ====
- Noureddine Aba, Gazelle après minuit, Algerian writer
- Alain Bosquet, Poémes, un, his collected works up to 1967
- André du Bouchet, Laisses
- Pierre Emmanuel, Una, ou la mort, la vie
- Claude Esteban, Terres, travaux du cœur, Flammarion
- Guillevic, Etier
- André Pieyre de Mandiargues, L'ivre Oeil
- Patrick Reumaux, Repérages du vif

=== India ===
Listed in alphabetical order by first name:

- Ajmer Rode, Surti, London, Ontario: Third Eye Publications, ISBN 0-919581-59-5 Chandigarh: Raghbir Rachna Parkashan; Punjabi-language
- Geeta Parikh, Bhinash; Gujarati-language
- K. Satchidanandan, Ezhuthachan Ezhutumbol, ("When the Poet Writes"); Malayalam-language
- Kunwar Narain, Apne Samne, New Delhi: Rajkamal Prakashan; Hindi-language
- Malika Amar Sheikh, Valuchya Priyakar, Mumbai: Dr Babasaheb Ambedkar Prabodhini; Marathi-language
- Rajendra Bhandari, Hiundey yee chisa raatka pardeharuma ("In the Veils of Cold Wintry Nights"), Gangtok, Sikkim: Padmakala Prakashan; Nepali-language

=== Poland ===
- Stanisław Barańczak, Etyka i poetyka ("Ethics and Poetics"), criticism; Paris: Instytut Literacki
- Ewa Lipska:
  - Dom spokojnej młodości ("A Home for Youth"), selected poems, Kraków: Wydawnictwo literackie
  - Zywa smierc, ("Living Death"); Kraków: Wydawnictwo literackie

=== Spanish ===
==== Spain ====
- Matilde Camus, Corcel en el tiempo ("Steed of the time")

==== Latin America ====
- Alaíde Foppa, Las palabras y el tiempo ("Words and time"), Guatemalan poet published in Mexico

=== Other ===
- Christoph Buchwald, general editor, and Harald Hartung, guest editor, Jahrbuch der Lyrik 1: Am Rand der Zeit ("Poetry Yearbook 1: On the Edge of Time"), publisher: Claassen; anthology; Germany
- Haim Gouri, Ayuma, Israeli writing in Hebrew
- Nizar Qabbani, I Testify That There Is No Woman But You, Syrian poet writing in Arabic

== Awards and honors ==
- Nobel Prize in Literature: Odysseus Elytis, Greek

=== Canada ===
- See 1979 Governor General's Awards for a complete list of winners and finalists for those awards.
- Prix Émile-Nelligan: François Charron, Blessures

=== United Kingdom ===
- Cholmondeley Award: Alan Brownjohn, Andrew Motion, Charles Tomlinson
- Eric Gregory Award: Stuart Henson, Michael Jenkins, Alan Hollinghurst, Sean O'Brien, Peter Thabit Jones, James Lindesay, Walter Perrie, Brian Moses

=== United States ===
- AML Award for Poetry to Marden J. Clark for "Moods: Of Late" and Edward L. Hart for "To Utah"
- Bollingen Prize: W.S. Merwin
- American Academy of Arts and Letters Gold Medal in Poetry, Archibald MacLeish
- Pulitzer Prize for Poetry: Robert Penn Warren: Now and Then
- Rhysling Award:
  - Michael Bishop, For the Lady of a Physicist (Long Form)
  - Duane Ackerson, Fatalities (Short Form, tie)
  - Steve Eng Story Books and Treasure Maps (Short Form, tie)
- Walt Whitman Award: David Bottoms, Shooting Rats at the Bibb County Dump
- Fellowship of the Academy of American Poets: May Swenson and Mark Strand

== Births ==
- February 4 - Ben Lerner, American poet, novelist and critic
- October 16 - Jonathan Edwards, Welsh, English-language poet
- Aifric Mac Aodha, Irish-language poet and editor
- Qabaniso Malewezi ('Q'), Malawian musician and English-language poet

== Deaths ==
Birth years link to the corresponding "[year] in poetry" article:

- February 8 - Alexandru A. Philippide (born 1900), Romanian
- February 9 - Allen Tate (born 1899), American poet, of emphysema
- June 15 - Ernst Meister (born 1911), German
- July 15 - Juana de Ibarbourou (born 1892), Uruguayan
- September 5 - John Bradburne (born 1921), English poet and missionary, killed by guerillas
- September 7 - I. A. Richards (born 1893), influential English literary critic and rhetorician
- October 6 - Elizabeth Bishop (born 1911), American poet, from an aneurism
- December 7 - Nicolas Born (born 1937), German poet, from cancer

== Notes ==
- Britannica Book of the Year 1980 ("for events of 1979"), published by Encyclopædia Britannica 1980 (source of many items in "Works published" section and rarely in other sections)

== See also ==
- Poetry
- List of poetry awards
- List of years in poetry
