= John of Paris (disambiguation) =

Various people and works of art are called Jean de Paris or John of Paris:

== People ==
- John of Paris, Jean Quidort, or Jean de Soardis, 1255-1306, French philosopher and Dominican friar
- Jean Perréal 1455-1530, French painter known as Jean de Paris
- Jean de Paris, a pseudonym of the French writer Adrien Marx 1837-1906, used for his newspaper column

== Art works ==
- Jean de Paris (Boieldieu), an 1812 comic opera
  - Gianni di Parigi, an 1839 opera buffa derived from Boieldieu's opera
- Jehan de Paris, a circa 1494 prose romance

== Other ==
- (Saint) Jean de Paris, Forest of Fontainebleau, a hilly area popular with artists
