= Adrien Marx =

French journalist and writer (1837–1906)

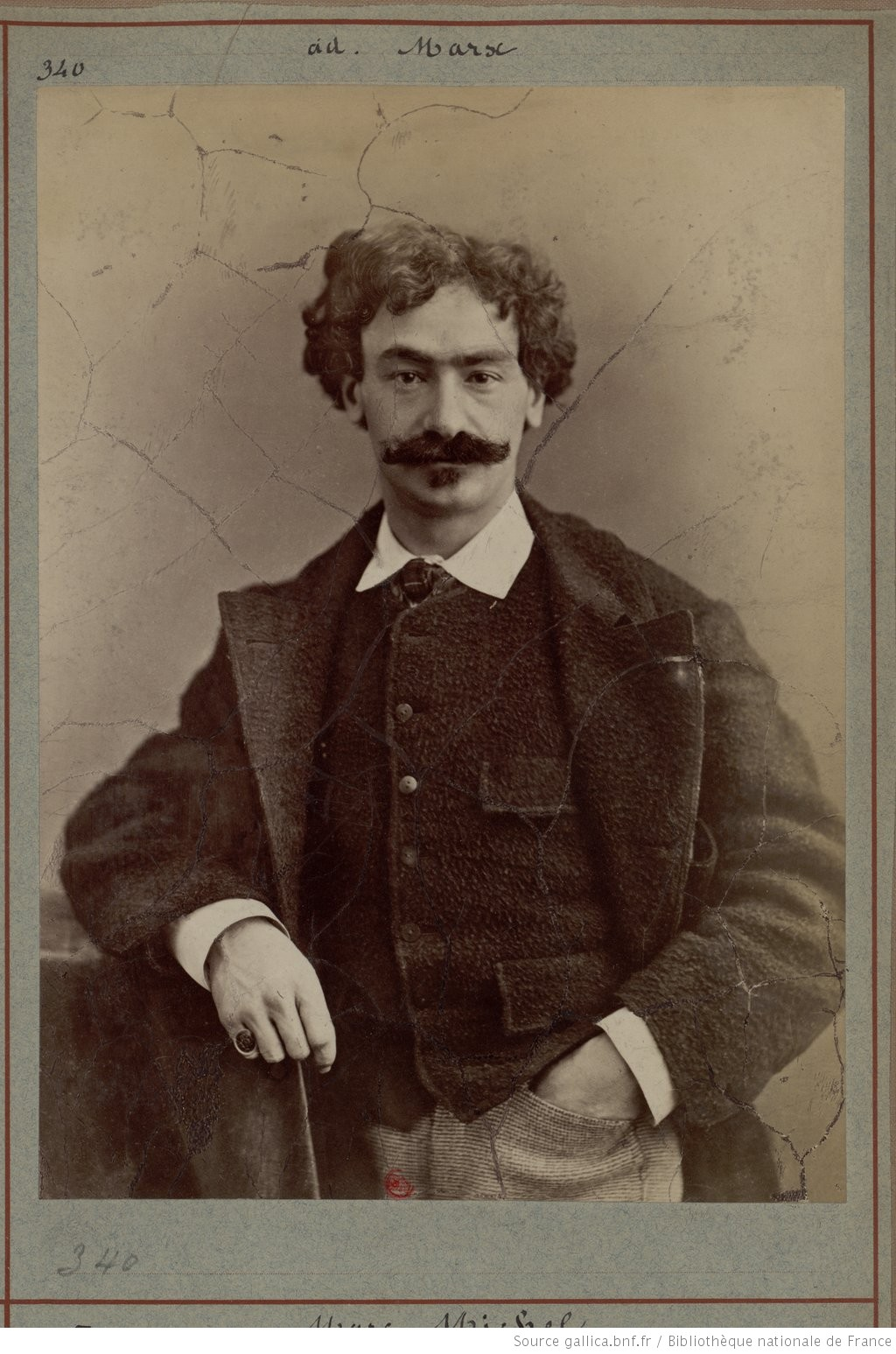
- Portrait by Atelier Nadar
- Born: 5 March 1837; Nancy, France
- Died: 15 July 1906 (aged 69); Beaulieu-sur-Mer, France
- Other name: Jean de Paris
- Occupation: Journalist
- Years active: 1863-1894

Napoléon Adrien Marx (1837–1906), generally known as Adrien Marx, was a French journalist, playwright, and writer who also used the pseudonym Jean de Paris.

He began by studying medicine, but by 1863, he started writing for Étienne Carjat's Le Boulevard. Soon thereafter, he joined the weekly Le Figaro; he wrote for it and other publications of Hippolyte de Villemessant for the rest of his career. In particular, under the pseudonym Jean de Paris, he wrote a daily column called "Un conseil par jour, guide pratique de la vie usuelle" 'A tip every day; a practical guide for everyday life'.

Marx popularized the interview genre and interviewed many of the greats of the time. These were collected in his Indiscrétions parisiennes, which were published in L'Événement. In particular, he interviewed Jules Verne for his Profils intimes, and wrote an introduction to any early English translation of Around the World in Eighty Days.

The Empress Eugénie had him document the news of the Court in the Moniteur universel. He also contributed under various pseudonyms to Diogène, Le Nain jaune, Le Peuple français, Le Petit Journal, Paris-Magazine, and others.

His plays were produced in Paris at the Vaudeville, the Gymnase-dramatique, the Folies-dramatiques, and the Bouffes-parisiens.

He retired to Beaulieu-sur-Mer in 1894 and died there in 1906.

== Works ==
- Histoires d'une minute (1864)
- Émile Abraham, Cartier, Un drame en l'air, bouffonnerie musicale en 1 acte (1865)
- Indiscrétions parisiennes (1866)
- Révélations sur la vie intime de Maximilien (1867)
- Les souverains à Paris (1868)
- Un peu de tout (1868)
- Philippe Gille, Insulte ma femme!, comédie en 1 acte (1872)
- A. Decourcelle, Le N° 13, pièce en 1 acte (1873)
- L'Orage, comédie en 1 acte (1874)
- Un conseil par jour, guide pratique de la vie usuelle (1879)
- Profils intimes, nouvelles indiscrétions parisiennes (1880)
- En plein air (1887)
- Les petits mémoires de Paris (1888)
- Silhouettes de mon temps (1889)
- Sub Jove (1890)
- Rives bénies (1895)
