= Cahier d'un retour au pays natal =

Book-length poem by Aimé Césaire

Cahier d'un retour au pays natal (first published in 1939, with two revised editions in 1947 and a final edition in 1956), variously translated as Notebook of a Return to My Native Land, Return to My Native Land, Notebook of a Return to the Native Land, or Journal of a Homecoming, is a book-length poem by Martinican writer Aimé Césaire. Considered his masterwork, the book mixes poetry and prose to express his thoughts on the cultural identity of black Africans in a colonial setting.

== History ==
After a rejection by the journal Cahiers du sud, Césaire submitted the manuscript of the poem to Georges Pelorson, director of the Parisian periodical Volontés, who published it in August 1939, just as Césaire was returning to Martinique to take up a post as a teacher. Césaire continued to revise the poem and published two expanded versions with more surrealist elements in 1947, first through Brentano's in New York and later Éditions Bordas in Paris, with an introductory essay by André Breton that had first appeared in 1943 in the New York-based review Hémisphêres under the title "Un grand poete noir". In his introduction Breton called the poem "nothing less than the greatest lyrical monument of our times."

A "definitive edition" was published in 1956 by Présence Africaine. In this final edition, which has further additions and revisions, Césaire deleted some material from the 1939 and 1947 editions, "leading the reader away from the spiritual sacrifice of the speaker and toward a sense of collective socialist action", as Arnold and Eshleman put it. Alex Gil argues for a holistic reading of the entire textual history of the poem through its religious, surrealist, and Marxian phases, not just the final edition, noting that "the poem's central theme and approach remain unchanged" throughout the four editions.

According to Bonnie Thomas, Cahier d'un retour au pays natal was a turning point in French Caribbean literature: "Césaire’s groundbreaking poem laid the foundations for a new literary style in which Caribbean writers came to reject the alienating gaze of the Other in favour of their own Caribbean interpretation of reality."

== Adaptations and tributes ==
The poem was adapted as a one-man show by Cy Grant, which he performed in 1978 at the Lyttelton Theatre and at the Royal Court Theatre Upstairs, as well as on tour for two years.

A passage from the poem provided the title for a volume of Selected Writings by C. L. R. James, At the Rendezvous of Victory (Allison and Busby, 1984), as well as an epigraph for that volume, much quoted by other writers, such as Edward Said.

For it is not true that the work of man is finished,
That we have nothing more to do in the world,
That we are just parasites in this world,
That it is enough for us to walk in step with the world,
For the work of man is only just beginning and it remains to conquer all,
The violence entrenched in the recess of his passion,
And no race holds a monopoly of beauty, of intelligence, of strength, and
There is a place for all at the rendezvous of victory.

== English translations ==
- Memorandum on My Martinique. Translated by Goll, Ivan; Abel, Lionel (Bilingual ed.). Brentano's. 1947.
- Return to My Native Land. Translated by Snyder, Emile (Bilingual ed.). Présence Africaine. 1968.
- Return to My Native Land. Translated by Berger, John; Bostock, Anna. Introduction by Mazisi Kunene. Penguin Books. 1969.
- Return to My Native Land. Translated by Berger, John; Bostock, Anna. Introduction by Mazisi Kunene; Illustrated by Peter de Francia. Archipelago Books. 2014. ISBN 978-1-93574494-8.
- Smith, Annette, ed. (2001) [1983]. Notebook of a Return to the Native Land. Translated by Eshleman, Clayton. Introduction by Andre Breton. Wesleyan University Press.
- Notebook of a Return to My Native Land / Cahier d'un retour au pays natal. Translated by Rosello, Mireille; Pritchard, Annie (Bilingual ed.). Bloodaxe Contemporary French Poets. 1995. ISBN 978-1-852-24184-1.
- The Original 1939 Notebook of a Return to the Native Land. Translated by Arnold, A. James; Eshleman, Clayton (Bilingual ed.). Wesleyan University Press. 2013.
- The Original 1939 Notebook of a Return to the Native Land. Translated by Arnold, A. James; Eshleman, Clayton (Bilingual ed.). Wesleyan University Press. 2013.
- Journal of a Homecoming / Cahier d′un retour au pays natal. Translated by Gregson Davis, N. Introduction, commentary and notes by F. Abiola Irele (Bilingual ed.). Duke University Press. 2017. ISBN 978-0-8223-6896-0.
