= Gerhard Dünnhaupt =

German bibliographer, literary historian and professor (1927–2024)

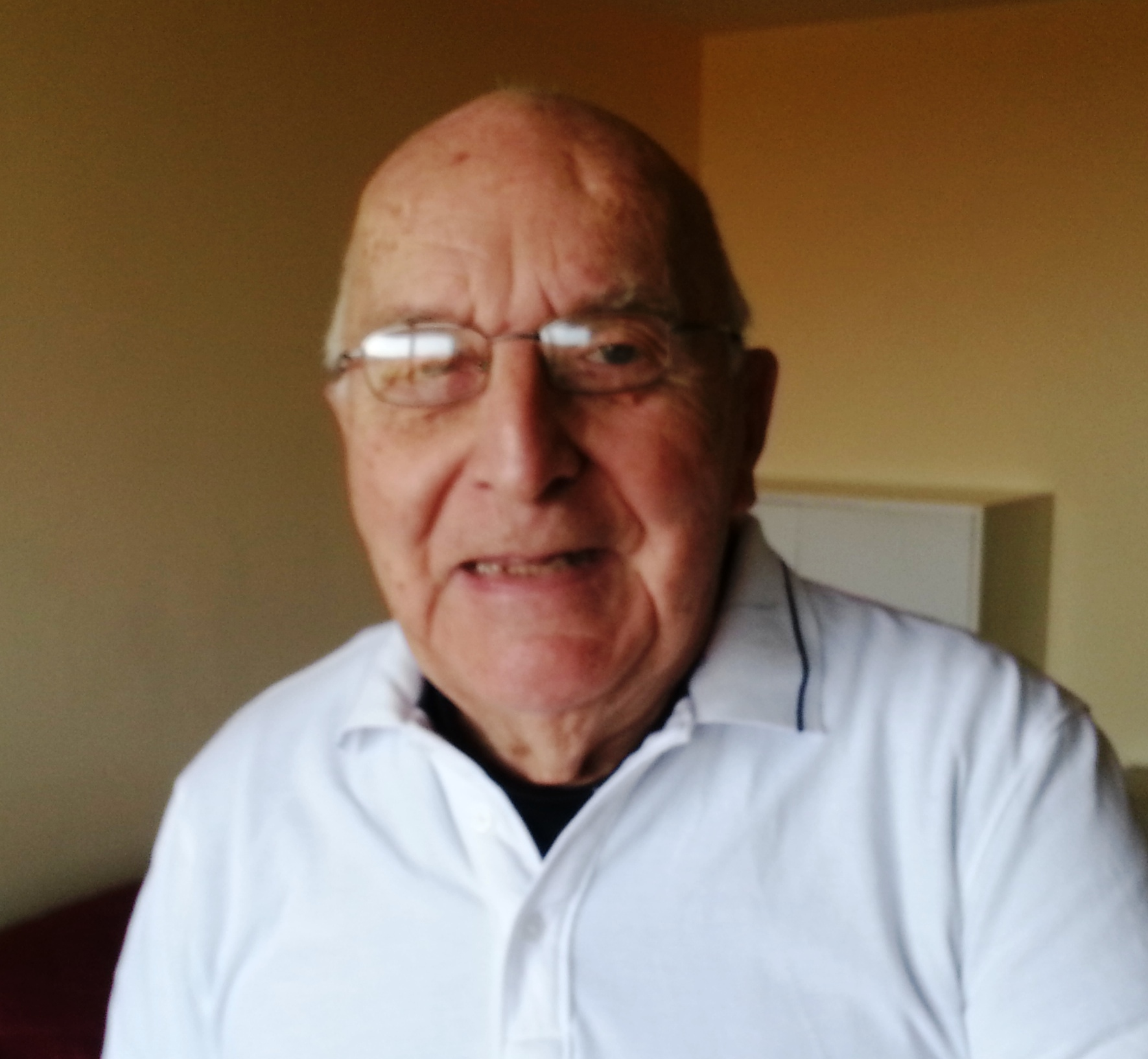
Gerhard Dünnhaupt

Gerhard Dünnhaupt, FRSC (15 August 1927 in Bernburg (Saale) – 17 November 2024 in Toronto) was a German bibliographer, literary historian, emeritus professor of the University of Michigan, an honorary life member of the Modern Language Association of America, Elected Fellow and Life Member of the Royal Society of Canada (Academies of Arts, Humanities and Sciences of Canada). In September 1983, he chaired the international Martin Luther Quincentennial Conference in Ann Arbor, MI. He is the author of the only annotated bibliography of German Baroque literature.

== Ancestry and background ==
Dünnhaupt is the son of a printer and newspaper publisher in Köthen (Anhalt). After graduation from high school in 1945 he entered the family business, attaining the master's degree in printing in 1949. He managed the estimating department of Giessen university press until his emigration to Canada, where he continued to work in printing and advertising. Beginning in 1964, he studied Modern Languages and Literatures at the University of Toronto, and, at Brown University in 1972, he submitted his dissertation about the German versions of the Italian Renaissance epics of Ludovico Ariosto and Torquato Tasso.

Beginning in 1972, he taught German Literature and Bibliography at the University of Washington; four years later, he relocated to the University of Michigan in Ann Arbor where he taught German Literature and Comparative Literature until 1992. During these years, he also fulfilled visiting professorships at the University of Illinois, the Universität Göttingen and Cornell University. Since 1992 he is professor emeritus at the University of Michigan and adjunct professor at Queen's University at Kingston. Dünnhaupt is an honorary life member of the Modern Language Association and a Fellow of the Royal Society of Canada/Académies des arts, des lettres et des sciences du Canada.

== Main research ==
Dünnhaupt's main research interests involve German Renaissance and Baroque literature, history of printing and publishing, bibliography, and cultural history of the Early Modern Period; his scholarly articles deal frequently with the Fruitbearing Society as well as the history of his homeland of Anhalt. He was Editor of Rarissima litterarum and Book Review Editor for Michigan Germanic Studies. In September 1983, he organised the "Martin Luther Quincentennial Conference".

== Honours ==
He was awarded the Prix Triennal de Bibliographie by the International League of Antiquarian Booksellers (ILAB) for his annotated Bibliographisches Handbuch der Barockliteratur, and upon his retirement, he was elected a Fellow of the Royal Society of Canada.

== Publications ==
- Bibliographisches Handbuch der Barockliteratur: Hundert Personalbibliographien deutscher Autoren des 17. Jahrhunderts. 3 vols. Hiersemann, Stuttgart 1980–1981, ISBN 3-7772-8029-1
- Diederich von dem Werder. Versuch einer Neuwertung seiner Hauptwerke. Herbert Lang, Bern 1973, ISBN 3-261-01084-3
- Die Fürstliche Druckerei zu Köthen. (AGB XX.4). Buchhändler-Vereinigung, Frankfurt am Main 1979, ISBN 3-7657-0934-4
- Personalbibliographien zu den Drucken des Barock. 6 vols. Anton Hiersemann, Stuttgart 1990–1993, ISBN 3-7772-9013-0

== Editions ==
- Rarissima litterarum (Editor)
- Torquato Tasso (Ed.), Diederich von dem Werder (Trans.): Gottfried von Bulljon. Niemeyer, Tübingen 1974, ISBN 3-484-16020-9
- Andreas Gryphius: Horribilicribrifax Teutsch. Scherzspiel. Critical variorum edition. Reclam, Stuttgart 1976, ISBN 3-15-000688-0
- Andreas Gryphius: Absurda Comica oder Herr Peter Squenz. Schimpfspiel. Critical variorum edition. Reclam, Stuttgart 1983, ISBN 3-15-007982-9
- Giovanni Francesco Loredano (Ed.), Diederich von dem Werder (Trans.): Dianea oder Rähtselgedicht. Reprint of the 1644 edition. Peter Lang, Bern 1984, ISBN 3-261-01833-X
- Martin Luther Quincentennial. Wayne State Univ. Press, Detroit 1985, ISBN 0-8143-1774-X
- Abraham a Sancta Clara: Stern so aus Jacob aufgangen Maria. Hiersemann, Stuttgart 1994, ISBN 3-7772-9423-3
- Johann Ludwig Prasch: Gründliche Anzeige von Fürtrefflichkeit und Verbesserung teutscher Poesie. Hiersemann, Stuttgart 1995, ISBN 3-7772-9426-8
- Gabriel Rollenhagen: Vier Bücher wunderbarlicher … und unglaublicher indianischer Reisen. Hiersemann, Stuttgart 1995, ISBN 3-7772-9424-1
- "Perseus Sperantes" (Ps.): Der Königliche Einspruch (anon. German version of the anon. French novel Jehan de Paris, ca. 1494). Hiersemann, Stuttgart 1995, ISBN 3-7772-9514-0
- probably Johannes Riemer: Der ausgekehrte politische Feuermäuerkehrer. Hiersemann, Stuttgart 1996, ISBN 3-7772-9605-8
- Johann Joseph Beckh: Elbianische Florabella … nach Arth einer Schäfferey. Hiersemann, Stuttgart 1997, ISBN 3-7772-9627-9
- Johann Vogel mit Georg Philipp Harsdörffer: Icones mortis (Dance of Death). Hiersemann, Stuttgart 1998, ISBN 3-7772-9822-0
- Conrad Vetter: Paradeißvogel. Hiersemann, Stuttgart 1999 (roman catholic hymnal 1613), ISBN 3-7772-9923-5

== Sources ==
- Adalbert Elschenbroich: Modell eines Handbuchs. Gerhard Dünnhaupts monumentale Bibliographie. In: Die Zeit. Jahrgang 37, Nr. 49 (1982), Lit. S. 5.
- Karl F. Otto Jr.: Dünnhaupt's Handbuch der Barockliteratur in: Monatshefte 76 (1984), 332–340.
- Gerhard Dünnhaupt: Ein Barockbibliograph plaudert aus der Schule in: Philobiblon 37 (1993), 337–349.
- Europäische Literatur der Spätrenaissance und der Barockzeit, meist aus der Sammlung Prof. Gerhard Dünnhaupt. Bassenge, Berlin 1996 (380 pages).
- Mara R. Wade, ed.: Collections and Books, Images and Texts: Early Modern German Cultures of the Book. Brill, Leiden 2023 (Chloe 49), ISBN 978-90-04-68224-5
