= Elvira Chaudoir =

Double-agent for the British during World War II

- Born: Elvira Concepción Josefina de la Fuente; 1911
- Died: January 1996 (aged 84–85); Beaulieu-sur-Mer, France
- Spouse: Jean Chaudoir
- Espionage activity
- Allegiance: UK
- Agency: MI5, MI6
- Service years: 1940–1945
- Codename: Cyril
- Dorette
- Bronx
- Operations: Double-Cross System, Operation Cockade, Operation Overlord

Elvira Concepción Josefina de la Fuente Chaudoir (1911 – January 1996) was a Peruvian socialite and a double-agent for the British Secret Intelligence Service during World War II. Chaudoir's deceptive communications to the Abwehr are credited with preventing the 11th Panzer Division from reinforcing German forces at Normandy.

== Early life ==
Elvira de la Fuente was born in 1911. Her father was a Peruvian guano exporter and diplomat. She was raised in Paris, attended a private school, and spoke fluent French, English and Spanish.

When she was 23, she married Jean Chaudoir. Unhappy in her marriage, she moved to Cannes with her girlfriend Romy Gilbey in 1938, where she socialized and gambled. When the Germans invaded France in 1940, Chaudoir and Gilbey fled to England.

== Espionage ==
Bored in England, Chaudoir spent much of her time gambling, losing, and complaining that because she was Peruvian, she could not find interesting work. An RAF officer overheard her complaints and her name was passed around until it reached Lieutenant Colonel Claude Edward Marjoribanks Dansey, the assistant chief of MI6, who made contact with Chaudoir using the pseudonym "Mr. Masefield". After mentioning his awareness of her financial difficulties, Dansey convinced Chaudoir to work for MI6, pointing out that as her father was currently the Peruvian chargé d'affaires to the Vichy government and she had a Peruvian passport, she could travel to France under the pretext of visiting him.

Dansey suggested that she let herself be recruited by the Germans so she could provide false intelligence to the Germans on behalf of MI6. Chaudoir was taught how to use invisible ink to send reports hidden within innocuous letters. Her first code name was "Cyril". Chaudoir's case officers were Christopher Harmer and Hugh Astor.

Chaudoir returned to France. In spring of 1941, Chaudoir was approached by Henri Chauvel, an unscrupulous French collaborator. Through Chauvel, Chaudoir became acquainted with Helmut Bleil, a German spy who went by the nickname of "Bibi". After several dates, Bleil suggested that Chaudoir might make money by providing political, financial, and industrial information about Britain to his unnamed "friends". Chaudoir's father had served in England as a Peruvian diplomat before being assigned to Vichy France. The Abwehr were interested in Chaudoir because of the perception that she had access to influential diplomatic circles. Bleil gave Chaudoir the code name of "Dorette" and arranged for her to receive £100 a month disguised as alimony payments. Bleil provided Chaudoir with a bottle of invisible ink which she was to use in letters to Chauvel who would pass them on to Bleil.

Chaudoir returned to England and reported to MI6, who debriefed her and handed her to MI5 to be put to use as a double agent. MI5's investigation into her background registered concern about her "lesbian tendencies" and they were unable to confirm Bleil's relationship with the German government. Chaudoir had a reputation as a frivolous, spendthrift socialite with "a colourful sex life". She was in a relationship with Monica Sheriffe, who was part of the Mayfair horsey set and a friend of the royal family. Chaudoir left instructions that "if anything is to happen to me, tell Monica Sheriffe" although MI5 didn't think Sherrife was aware of Chaudoir's espionage work. The MI5 investigation concluded, "She is merely a member of the international smart gambling set." Despite objections by John Cecil Masterman, Chaudoir was added to the Double-Cross System team on 28 October 1942 with a new code name, "Bronx", after the cocktail. She was given a cover job at the BBC.

MI5 tapped Chaudoir's phone, both to monitor her for pro-German sentiments and to keep an eye on her financial situation. Under direction of her Double Cross handler, Chaudoir planted half-truths, propaganda, and invented quotes from real people in her letters to Chauvel. One of her letters claimed that the British had made excellent preparations to defend against gas warfare as well as stockpiling large amounts of chemical weapons for retaliation, which Masterman believed helped dissuade the Germans from using poison gas against England. German communications to Chaudoir indicated that they trusted her reliability as their agent, and her handler in MI5 described Chaudoir as "probably one of our most reliable agents."

As part of Operation Cockade, Chaudoir told the Germans that the invasion of France was planned for September while other Double Cross agents were sending similar misinformation to their contacts in corroboration. However, the Germans failed to react.

As the Germans became more anxious for immediate information about any invasion plans, Bleil instructed Chaudoir to send a message to a Lisbon bank indicating when and where the attack would occur. The message could not make use of the invisible ink, so locations were mapped to specific amounts of money. Chaudoir was to send a telegram requesting a specific amount from the bank, which would indicate the location of the invasion, and use one of several planned phrases to indicate the timing.

Planning the invasion, the Allies were concerned about the German forces on the west coast of France, fearing they would mobilize to reinforce the Germans at Normandy. In support of Operation Overlord, Chaudoir was instructed to send a telegram on 27 May 1944: "Envoyez vite cinquante livres. J'ai besoin pour mon dentiste" (English: "Send fifty pounds quickly. I need it for my dentist."). The bank director immediately passed it on to German intelligence. In Berlin, the message was decoded to mean "I have definite news that a landing is to be made in the Bay of Biscay in one week." An entire tank division was waiting at the Bay of Biscay when the Allies landed at Normandy. Masterman credited Chaudoir's telegram for the 11th Panzer Division remaining in the southwest of France to defend against an attack that never came.

When the D-Day invasion took place, Chaudoir sent mail to Bleil explaining why her warning had been incorrect, blaming it on her informant. After the initial landing at Normandy, Chaudoir and other Double Cross agents passed information to their German contacts that Normandy was just a diversion. Chaudoir's letter said, "Only part of Allied force in Normandy operations, bulk remains here at present" and hinted at a second invasion.

Toward the end of the war, Chaudoir travelled to Madrid to meet with German intelligence, but was unable to locate a single German spy. After she wrote them a scathing letter, they asked her to use the telegram to the bank method again to let them know if an invasion was planned for Scandinavia or northern Germany.

== Later life ==
When peace was declared, Chaudoir retired to Beaulieu-sur-Mer where she ran a gift shop called l'Heure Bleu. Chaudoir resided in the south of France after the war until her death. MI5 sent her a cheque for £5,000 in December 1995 in recognition of her war-time service. She died in January 1996, age 85. The MI5 files on Elvira Chaudoir were made public on 5 September 2005.

== See also ==
- Juan Pujol García

== Sources ==
- Haufler, Hervie (2014). The Spies Who Never Were: The True Story of the Nazi Spies Who Were Actually Allied Double Agents. Open Road Media. ISBN 978-1-4976-2262-3.
- Macintyre, Ben (2012). Double Cross: The True Story of the D-Day Spies. Crown Publishers. ISBN 978-0-307-88875-4.
- Maggs, Sam (2016). Wonder Women. Quirk Books. ISBN 9781594749254.
