= Anya Berger =

Russian-British translator, intellectual, and feminist (1923–2018)

- Born: Anna Zisserman; 1923 Harbin, Republic of China
- Died: 23 February 2018 (aged 94) Geneva, Switzerland
- Occupation: Translator, intellectual, feminist
- Spouse: Stephen Bostock (1942–?)
- Partner: John Berger (1958–1970s)
- Children: 4

Anya Berger (née Anna Zisserman; published as Anna Bostock; 1923 – 23 February 2018) was a Russian-British translator, intellectual, and feminist, whose work has been described as having "shaped the horizons of the English-speaking left on issues of race, gender and class". She was best known for her translations of thinkers such as Leon Trotsky, Wilhelm Reich, Vladimir Lenin, and Karl Marx.

== Early life and education ==
Anna Zisserman, later known as Anya, was born in 1923 in Harbin, China, to Matilda (née Glogau) and Vladimir Zisserman, a Russian landowner. Zisserman had older siblings, and spent her early years among an émigré community displaced by the Russian revolution before travelling to Vienna in 1936 to live with her mother's Jewish family members. Following the Nazi annexation of Austria, Zisserman escaped to Britain without her family and attended the St Paul's Girls' School in London.

She studied modern language at the University of Oxford.

== Career ==
Bostock began her career working as a Russian monitor with Reuters, translating radio broadcasts and some of Stalin’s speeches.

Following the end of World War II, Bostock continued her translation work, now for the recently established United Nations. She joined a circle of leftwing artists and intellectuals, among them the historian Eric Hobsbawm, writer Doris Lessing, and artist Peter de Francia.

She wrote fiction reviews for the Manchester Guardian, and read for the publishers Methuen and Hutchinson. As Anna Bostock, she became a prolific translator into English, including of works by Trotsky, Lenin, Marx, Le Corbusier, and Ernst Fischer.

After moving to Geneva, Berger resumed translation work for the United Nations and became active in the women's liberation movement.

In 1972, Berger made a BBC radio programme titled Women’s Liberation. She was also a contributor to the feminist journal Spare Rib.

Berger continued working and travelling widely into her 80s, described as remaining "a ferocious intellectual" into her later years. Her last translation was Gesture and Speech by André Leroi-Gourhan, published in 1993.

== Personal life ==
Zisserman married British intelligence officer Stephen Bostock in 1942, with whom she later had two children. The marriage ended shortly after World War II. Following the divorce, Bostock took his children from the United States back to England, resulting in a public custody battle.

Anya Bostock returned to England. There, she met Italian-British painter Peter de Francia, with whom she had a romantic relationship. She credited him for her political awakening. In 1951, she met writer and artist John Berger, beginning a romantic relationship in 1958. She later changed her name to Berger by deed poll. The couple had two children before separating in 1976.

She died in Geneva on 23 February 2018 at age 94.

== Legacy ==
Since her death, writers such as Tom Overton have posited the importance of recognising Berger and her work, including "as part of a broader recent movement to recognize the labour of translators, not least because it has often been invisible work, often by women." Berger had spoken six languages: Russian, German, French, English, some Polish and Serbo-Croat. She is noted for having been responsible for translating "some of the great socialist thought of the twentieth century into English".

== Selected bibliography ==
- The Modulor by Le Corbusier (with Peter de Francia; London: Faber and Cambridge, Mass,: Harvard University Press, 1954)
- Modulor 2 by Le Corbusier (with Peter de Francia; London: Faber, 1958, and Cambridge, Mass.: Harvard University Press, 1958)
- Julio Jurenito by Ilya Ehrenburg (with Yvonne Kapp; London: MacGibbon & Kee, 1958)
- People and Life: Memoirs of 1891-1917 by Ilya Ehrenburg (with Yvonne Kapp; London: MacGibbon & Kee, 1961)
- Return to My Native Land by Aimé Césaire (with John Berger; Harmondsworth: Penguin, 1969)
- Marx in His Own Words (London: Penguin Press, 1970)
- The Necessity of Art by Ernst Fischer (London: Penguin, 1971)
- Lenin in His Own Words (London: Penguin Press, 1972)
- Sex-pol: Essays 1929-34 by Wilhelm Reich, ed. Lee Baxandall (with Tom Dubose and Lee Baxandall (New York: Random House, 1972)
- The Great Art of Living Together: Poems on the Theater by Bertolt Brecht (with John Berger; London: Grenville, 1972)
- Understanding Brecht by Walter Benjamin (London: NLB, 1973)
- The Theory of the Novel by György Lukács (Cambridge, MA: MIT Press, 1974)
- Soul and Form by György Lukács (Cambridge, MA: MIT Press, 1974)
- Gesture and Speech by André Leroi-Gourhan (Cambridge, MA: MIT Press, 1993)
