= Mazisi Kunene =

African poet (1930–2006)

- Born: Mazisi kaMdabuli Kunene; 12 May 1930; Durban, South Africa
- Died: 11 August 2006 (aged 76); Durban, South Africa
- Education: University of Natal
- Occupation: Poet
- Notable work: Emperor Shaka the Great

Mazisi (Raymond) Kunene (12 May 1930 – 11 August 2006) was a South African poet best known for his translation of the epic Zulu poem Emperor Shaka the Great. While in exile from South Africa's apartheid regime, Kunene was an active supporter and organiser of the anti-apartheid movement in Europe and Africa. He later taught at the University of California, Los Angeles, and become Africa's and South Africa's first poet laureate.

== Early life ==
Kunene was born in Durban in the province of KwaZulu-Natal, South Africa, to Eva Kunene (nee Ngcobo), a teacher, and Mdabuli Albert Kunene, a labourer. From very early in his childhood at Amahlongwa on the south coast of Durban, he began writing poetry and short stories in Zulu, and by the age of 11 he was being published in local papers. He went on to earn a Bachelor of Arts degree from the University of Natal in Zulu and history, and later a Master of Arts in Zulu Poetry. His Master's thesis was titled An Analytical Survey of Zulu Poetry, Both Traditional and Modern. In it Kunene criticized the changing nature of Zulu literature, and its emulation of the Western tradition. He won a Bantu Literary Competition in 1956 and left for London, England, to study at the School of Oriental and African Studies, University of London, in 1959.

== Career ==
He opposed the apartheid government as the head of the African United Front. Fleeing into exile from the country in 1959, he helped push for the anti-apartheid movement in Britain between 1959 and 1968. Kunene was closely affiliated with the African National Congress (ANC), quickly becoming their main representative in Europe and the United States in 1962. He would later become the director of finance for the ANC in 1972. He became a professor of African literature at the University of California, Los Angeles (UCLA) in 1975 after lecturing in a number of universities (including the University of Iowa and Stanford University). as a cultural advisor for UNESCO. He remained at UCLA for nearly two decades, retiring in 1992.

=== Literary works ===
Kunene wrote and published poetry from very early in his life. His works were written originally in Zulu and then translated into English. In 1966, his works were banned by the Apartheid government of South Africa. In 1969, he wrote an introduction to the translation by John Berger and Anna Bostock of Aimé Césaire's Return to My Native Land.

In 1970, Kunene published Zulu Poems, an anthology of poems ranging from "moral reflection to political commentary".

In Emperor Shaka the Great, published in English in 1979, Kunene tells the story of the rise of the Zulu people under Shaka. World Literature Today contributor Christopher Larson described it as "a monumental undertaking and achievement by any standards".

Anthem of the Decades:A Zulu Epic published in English in 1981, tells the Zulu legend of how death came to humankind. In 1982, Kunene published a second collection of poems titled The Ancestors and the Sacred Mountain: Poems containing 100 of his poems. This collection had a particular emphasis on socio-political topics.

Unodumehlezi Kamenzi was published in 2017 on the tenth anniversary of his death. This book is the isiZulu edition of Emperor Shaka the Great and embraces Kunene's original dream to have his poem published as intended in the original isiZulu form.

== Late life ==
Kunene returned to South Africa in 1992, where he taught at the University of Natal until his retirement. UNESCO made him Africa's poet laureate in 1993 and in 2005 he became South Africa's first poet laureate.

== Death and legacy ==
Kunene died aged 76 on 11 August 2006 in Durban, after a lengthy bout with cancer. He is buried at Mhluzini Cemetery at Amahlongwa, a stone's throw from where he attended primary education.

On 12 May 2022, which would have been Kunene's 92nd birthday, he was commemorated with a Google Doodle.

== Bibliography ==
Poetic works:

- Zulu Poems. New York, Africana Publishing Corporation, 1970
- Emperor Shaka the Great: A Zulu Epic. London, Heinemann, 1979 (transcription and translation of traditional epic)
- Anthem of the Decades: A Zulu Epic Dedicated to the Women of Africa. London, Heinemann, 1981
- The Ancestors and the Sacred Mountain: Poems. London, Heinemann, 1982
- Isibusiso Sikamhawu, Via Afrika, 1994
- Indida Yamancasakazi, 1995
- Amalokotho Kanomkhubulwane, 1996
- Umzwilili wama-Afrika, Kagiso, 1996
- Igudu lika Somcabeko, Van Schaik, 1997
- Echoes from the Mountain. New and Selected Poems by Mazisi Kunene, Malthouse Press, 2007
- Unodumehlezi Kamenzi, 2017
