= Villa de May =

Coordinates: 43°42′14″N 7°19′41″E

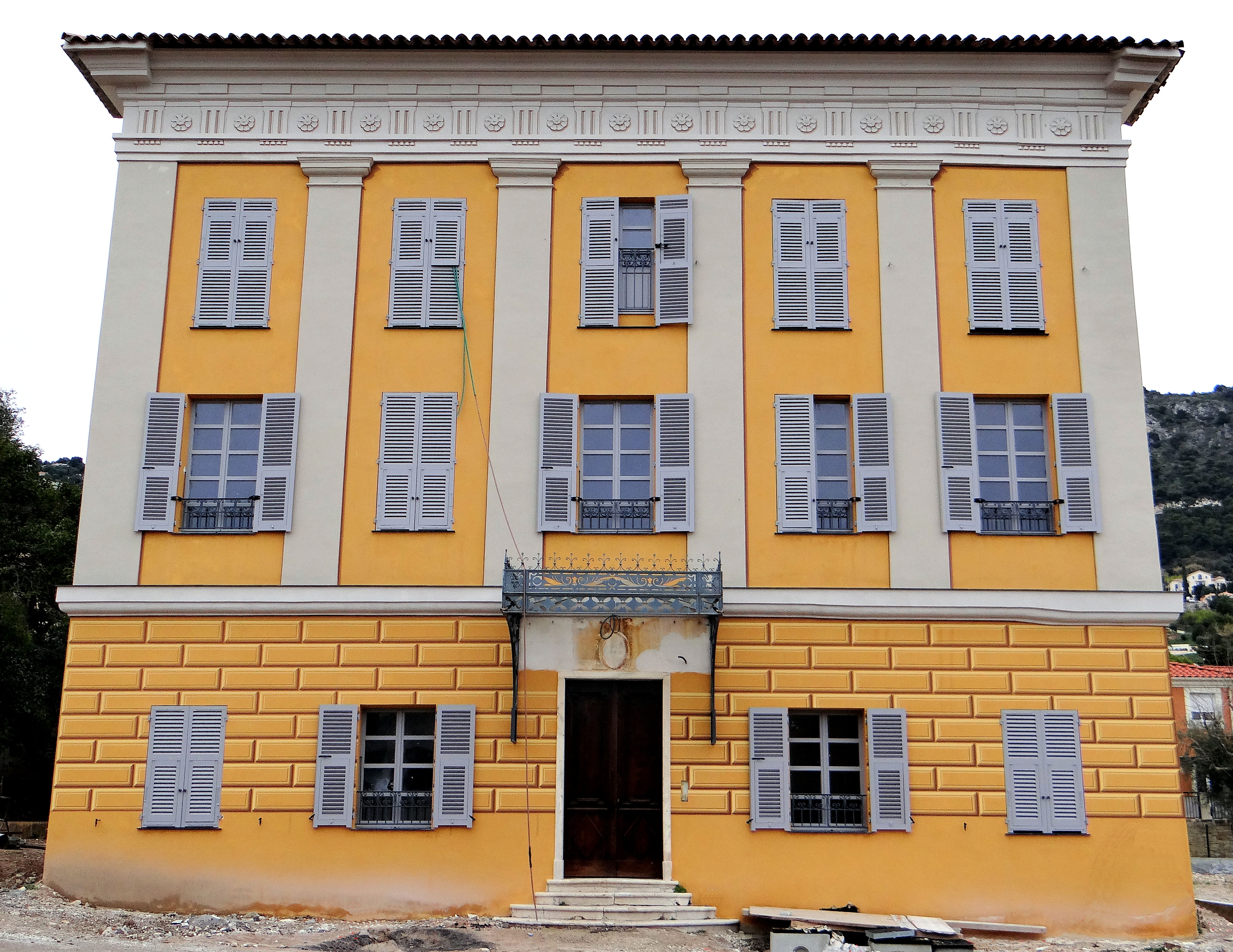
- The Villa de May in 2014
- Interactive map of the Villa de May area

General information
- Type: House
- Location: Beaulieu-sur-Mer, France
- Completed: 1826
- Client: Gaétan de May

The Villa de May is a historic mansion in Beaulieu-sur-Mer, France. It was built in 1826 for Gaétan de May. It was purchased by the city of Beaulieu-sur-Mer in 1967 and was designated a monument historique on 25 January 1980. It now houses a music conservatory.
