= Beaulieu-sur-Mer =

Commune in Provence-Alpes-Côte d'Azur, France

Beaulieu-sur-Mer Bèuluec de Mar (Occitan)
- Commune
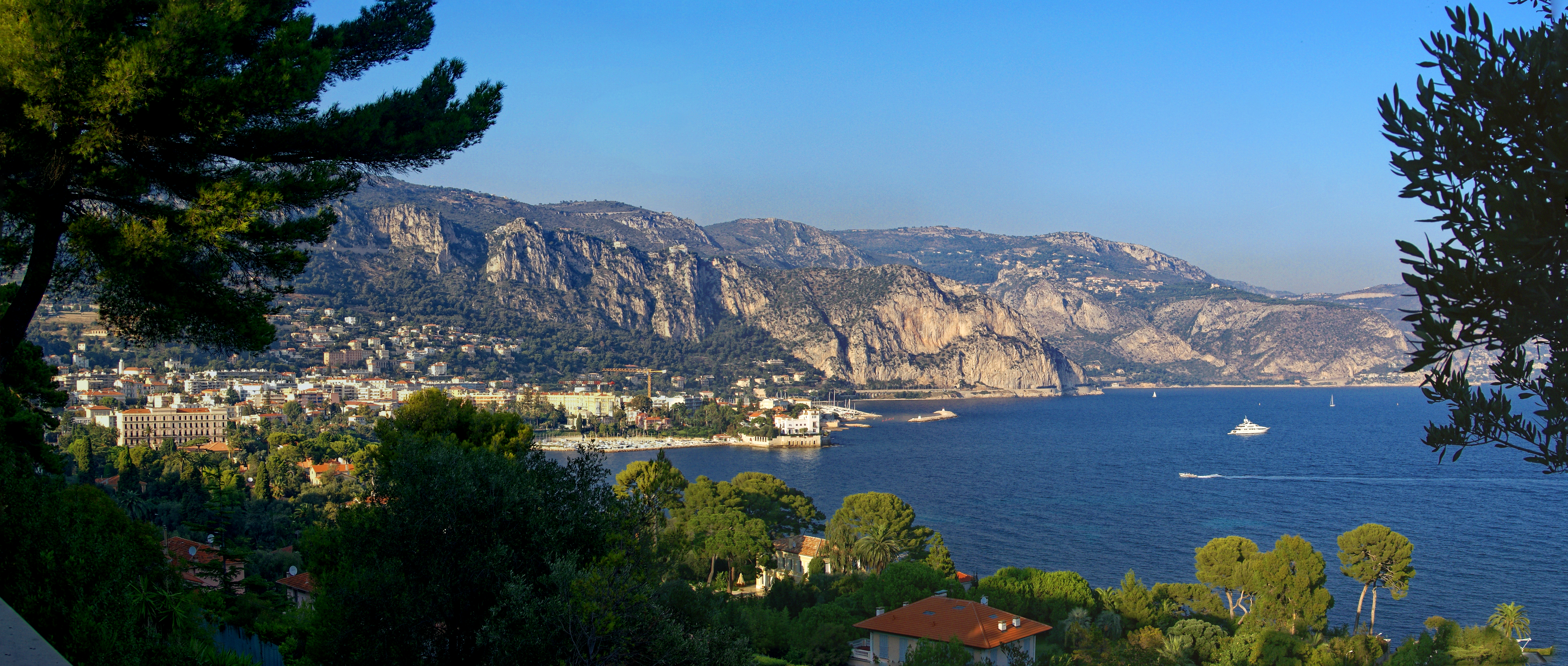
- The seafront in Beaulieu-sur-Mer seen from the gardens of the Villa Ephrussi de Rothschild in Saint-Jean-Cap-Ferrat

- Coat of arms
- Location of Beaulieu-sur-Mer
- Location within France Location within Provence-Alpes-Côte d'Azur
- Coordinates: 43°42′18″N 7°19′48″E
- Country: France
- Region: Provence-Alpes-Côte d'Azur
- Department: Alpes-Maritimes
- Arrondissement: Nice
- Canton: Beausoleil
- Intercommunality: Métropole Nice Côte d'Azur

Government
  - Mayor (2026–32): Roger Roux
- Area^{1}: 0.92 km^{2} (0.36 sq mi)
- Highest elevation: 189 m (620 ft)
- Lowest elevation: 0 m (0 ft)
- Population (2023): 3,874
  - Density: 4,200/km^{2} (11,000/sq mi)
- Demonym: Berlugans
- Time zone: UTC+01:00 (CET)
  - Summer (DST): UTC+02:00 (CEST)
- INSEE/Postal code: 06011 /06310
- Website: beaulieusurmer.fr
- ^{1} French Land Register data, which excludes lakes, ponds, glaciers > 1 km^{2} (0.386 sq mi or 247 acres) and river estuaries.

Beaulieu-sur-Mer (French: [boljø syʁ mɛʁ]; Occitan: Bèuluec de Mar; Italian: Belluogo, formerly), or simply Beaulieu, is a seaside commune on the French Riviera between Nice and the Principality of Monaco. Located in the Alpes-Maritimes department in the Provence-Alpes-Côte d'Azur region, it borders the communes of Saint-Jean-Cap-Ferrat and Villefranche-sur-Mer, not far from Èze to the northeast. Its inhabitants are called Berlugans (masculine) and Berluganes (feminine). In French, its name translates into "Beautiful Place on Sea".

== History ==
Beaulieu-sur-Mer was inhabited in prehistoric times; a port was built by Ligurians before Romans took over the site.

The area was part of the commune of Villefranche-sur-Mer until mid-1891, when the French Parliament voted in favour of the bill allowing for the separation following local support and a positive recommendation from the General Council of Alpes-Maritimes. The first municipal elections were held on 20 September 1891 after President Sadi Carnot signed the bill into law the preceding 23 July.

The commune was renamed Beaulieu-sur-Mer from Beaulieu in 1908; the name has previously been changed from the Italian name Belloloco in 1860, after the incorporation of the County of Nice into France.

In the late 19th century and early 20th century, it became a popular destination for the international elite in the winter season. Tourism helped the commune develop economically, as it welcomed writer Leo Tolstoy, civil engineer Gustave Eiffel, publisher James Gordon Bennett Jr., composer Igor Stravinsky, as well as other personalities and monarchs from major European countries.

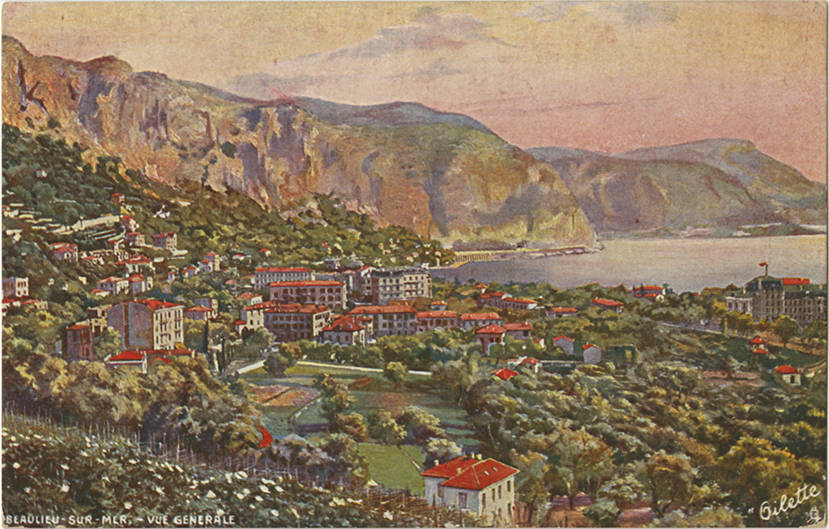
Beaulieu-sur-Mer in 1909

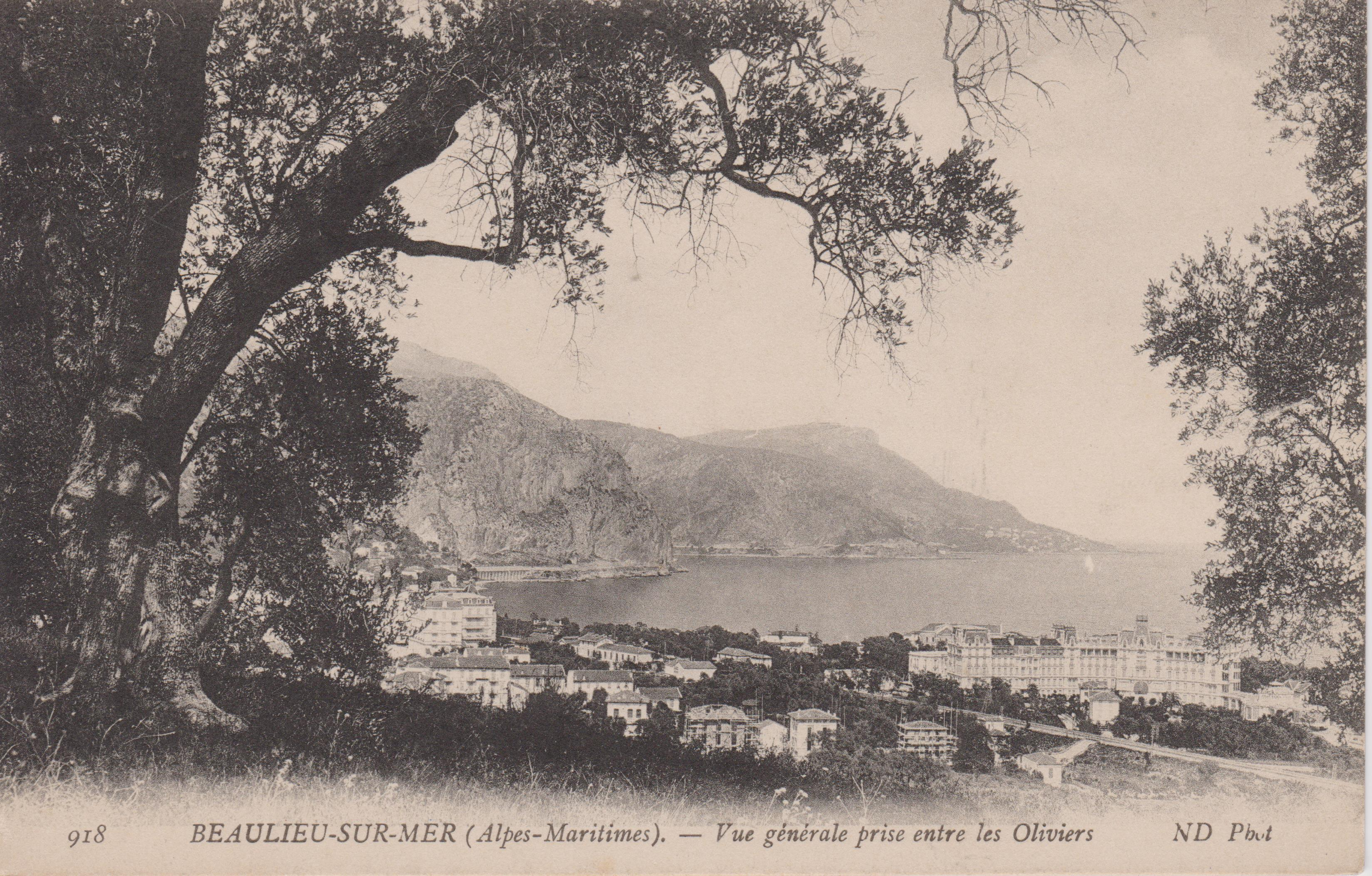
View from the heights of town

Today Beaulieu-sur-Mer is renowned as a Mediterranean resort village with quality marina facilities. It is also known for its the Villa Kerylos, built between 1902 and 1908 following the plans of architect Emmanuel Pontremoli.

== Geography ==
With a territory of 0.92 km^{2} (0.36 sq mi), Beaulieu-sur-Mer is the smallest commune in Alpes-Maritimes in terms of surface area. However, it is also one of the most densely populated. It forms part of Métropole Nice Côte d'Azur.

== Demographics ==
Historical population
Year	Pop.	±% p.a.
1968	4,050	—
1975	4,273	+0.77%
1982	4,302	+0.10%
1990	4,013	−0.87%
1999	3,675	−0.97%
2007	3,720	+0.15%
2012	3,764	+0.24%
2017	3,715	−0.26%
2023	3,874	+0.70%
Source: INSEE

== Sights ==
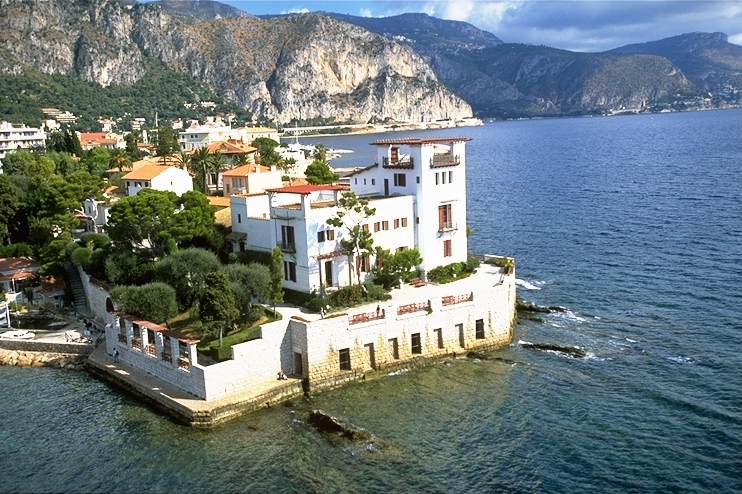
Aerial view of the Villa Kerylos

The Villa Kerylos is a structure on a low rocky promontory by the sea. It was built at the beginning of the 20th century by archeologist Théodore Reinach in the style of an ancient Greek villa at the time of Pericles. The villa was bequeathed to the Institut de France in 1928. It is currently classified as a monument historique.

== Transport ==
Beaulieu-sur-Mer is served by TER Provence-Alpes-Côte d'Azur (TER PACA) services at Beaulieu-sur-Mer station on the Marseille–Ventimiglia railway.

== International relations ==
Beaulieu-sur-Mer is a sister city of Tempe, Arizona, US. Every year, four French students are paired with four American students; they each spend five weeks in one another's country. This student exchange is with the Tempe Sister Cities organisation, which was voted "Best Overall Sister City Program" in 1998 and 2004.

== In popular culture ==
Beaulieu-sur-Mer was used in the 1970 film Cold Sweat and served as the fictional town of "Beaumont-sur-Mer" in the hit 1988 film Dirty Rotten Scoundrels and the 2019 film The Hustle.

== Notable people ==
- Aleksandr Sukhovo-Kobylin (1817–1903 in Beaulieu-sur-Mer), a Russian philosopher and playwright
- Henry Holroyd, 3rd Earl of Sheffield (1832–1909 in Beaulieu-sur-Mer), a Conservative politician
- Napoléon Adrien Marx (1837–1906 in Beaulieu-sur-Mer), journalist, playwright, and writer
- Richard Belzer (1944–2023 in Beaulieu-sur-Mer), an American actor and comedian
- James Gordon Bennett Jr. (1841–1918 in Beaulieu-sur-Mer) publisher of the New York Herald.
- Ralph Wormeley Curtis (1854–1922 in Beaulieu-sur-Mer) an American Impressionist painter.
- Elizabeth Sarancheva (1860–1923 in Beaulieu-sur-Mer) Tereshchenko family philanthropist.
- Sir Frederick John Jackson (1860–1929 in Beaulieu-sur-Mer) administrator, explorer and ornithologist.
- Henry Beckles Willson (1869–1942 in Beaulieu-sur-Mer) Canadian journalist, soldier, historian and author
- Jacques Schneider (1879–1928 in Beaulieu-sur-Mer) balloonist and aircraft enthusiast, he created the Schneider Trophy.
- Hans May (1886–1959 in Beaulieu-sur-Mer) an Austrian-born composer and British exile in WWII
- Mark Slonim (1894–1976 in Beaulieu-sur-Mer) a Russian politician, literary critic and scholar.
- Adrienne Górska (1899–1969 in Beaulieu-sur-Mer) a Polish architect who worked in the Modernist and Art Deco styles
- Elvira Chaudoir (ca.1910–1996 in Beaulieu-sur-Mer) a Peruvian socialite and MI6 double-agent in WWII.
- Peter de Francia (1921 in Beaulieu-sur-Mer – 2012) an Italian-British artist and Professor of Painting at the Royal College of Art, London from 1972 to 1986.
- Madanjeet Singh (1924–2013 in Beaulieu-sur-Mer) an Indian diplomat, painter, photographer and writer.
- Nadia Nerina (1927–2008 in Beaulieu-sur-Mer) a South African ballerina of The Royal Ballet

== Gallery ==
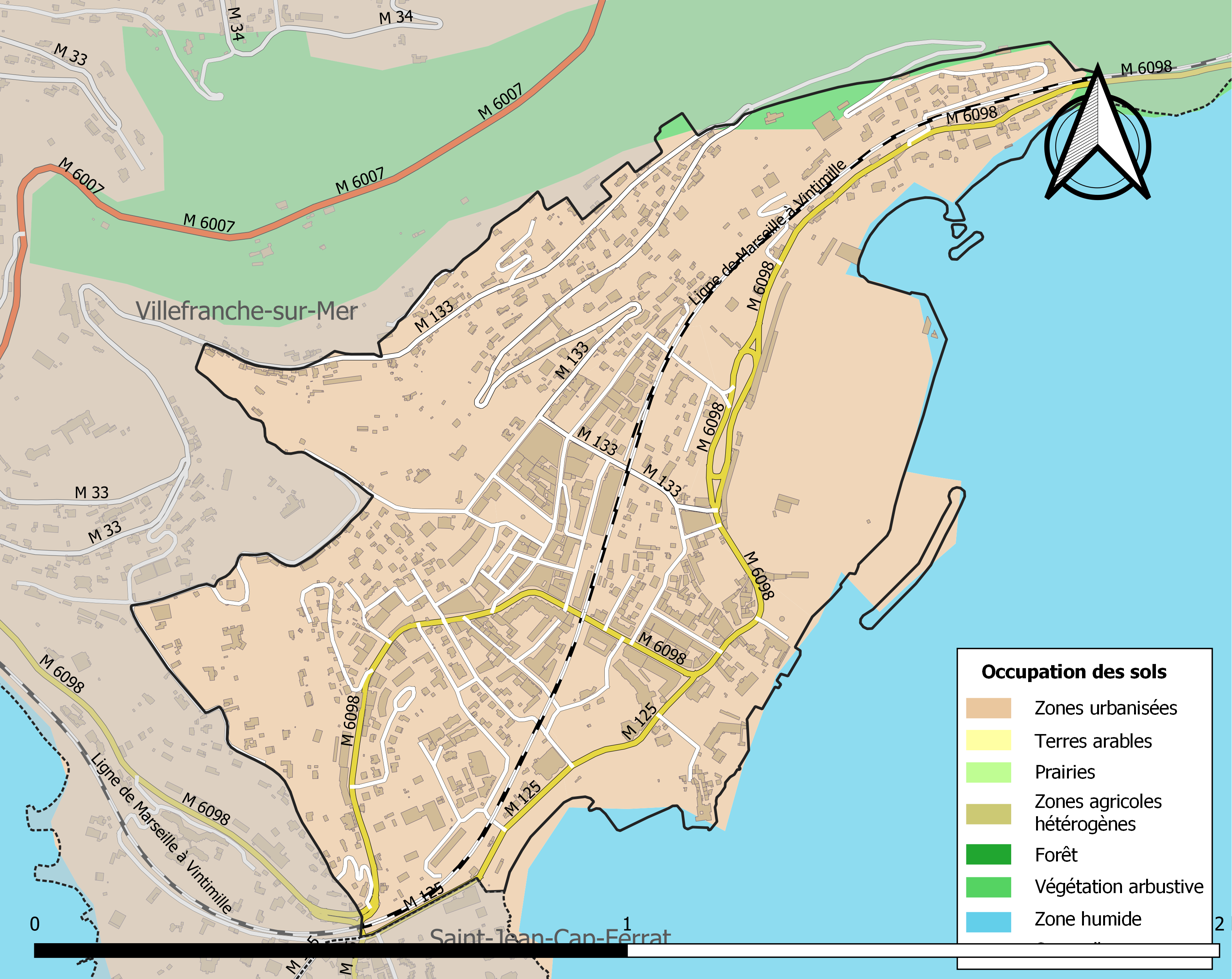
2018 map of Beaulieu-sur-Mer

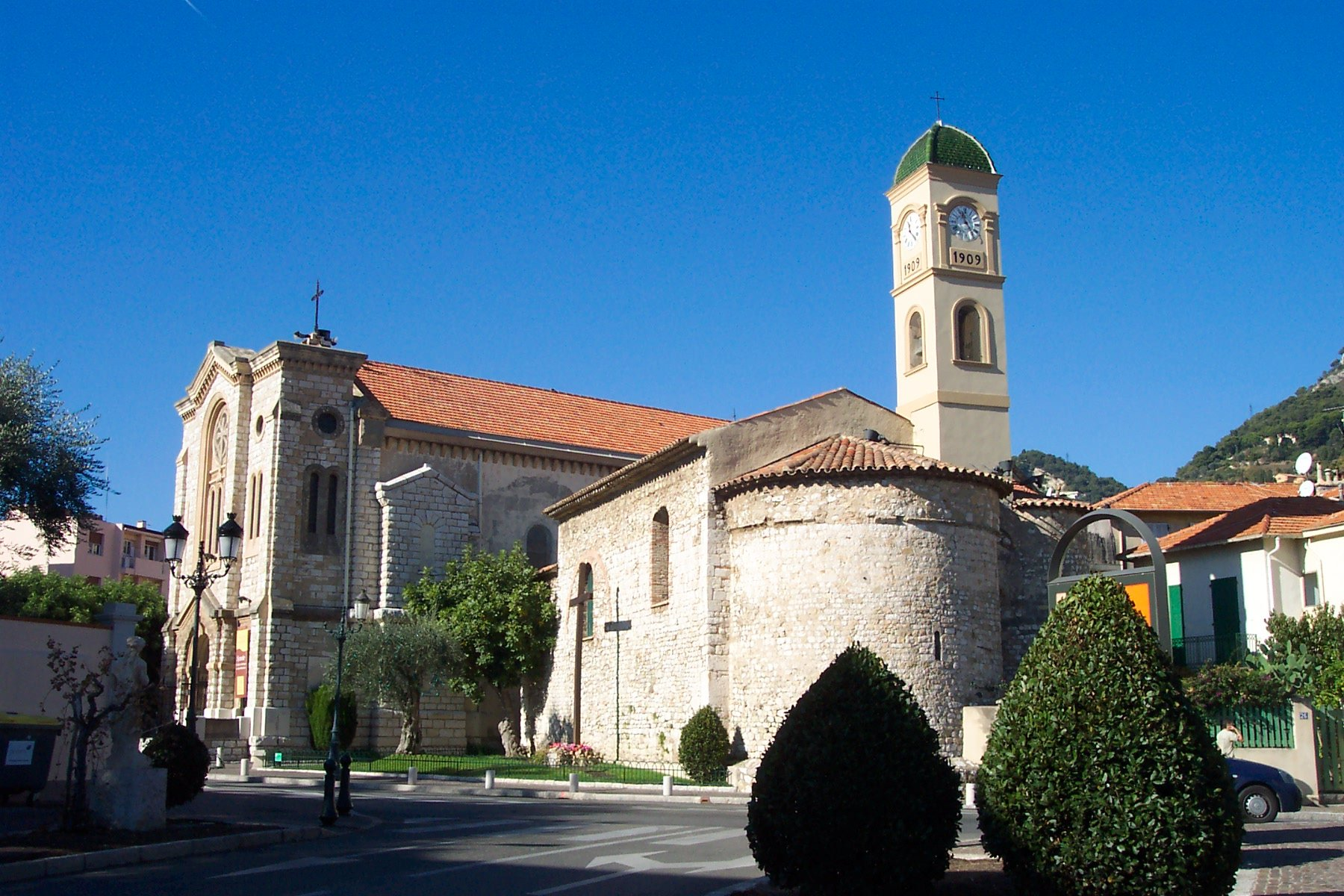
Chapelle Sancta-Maria-de-Olivo

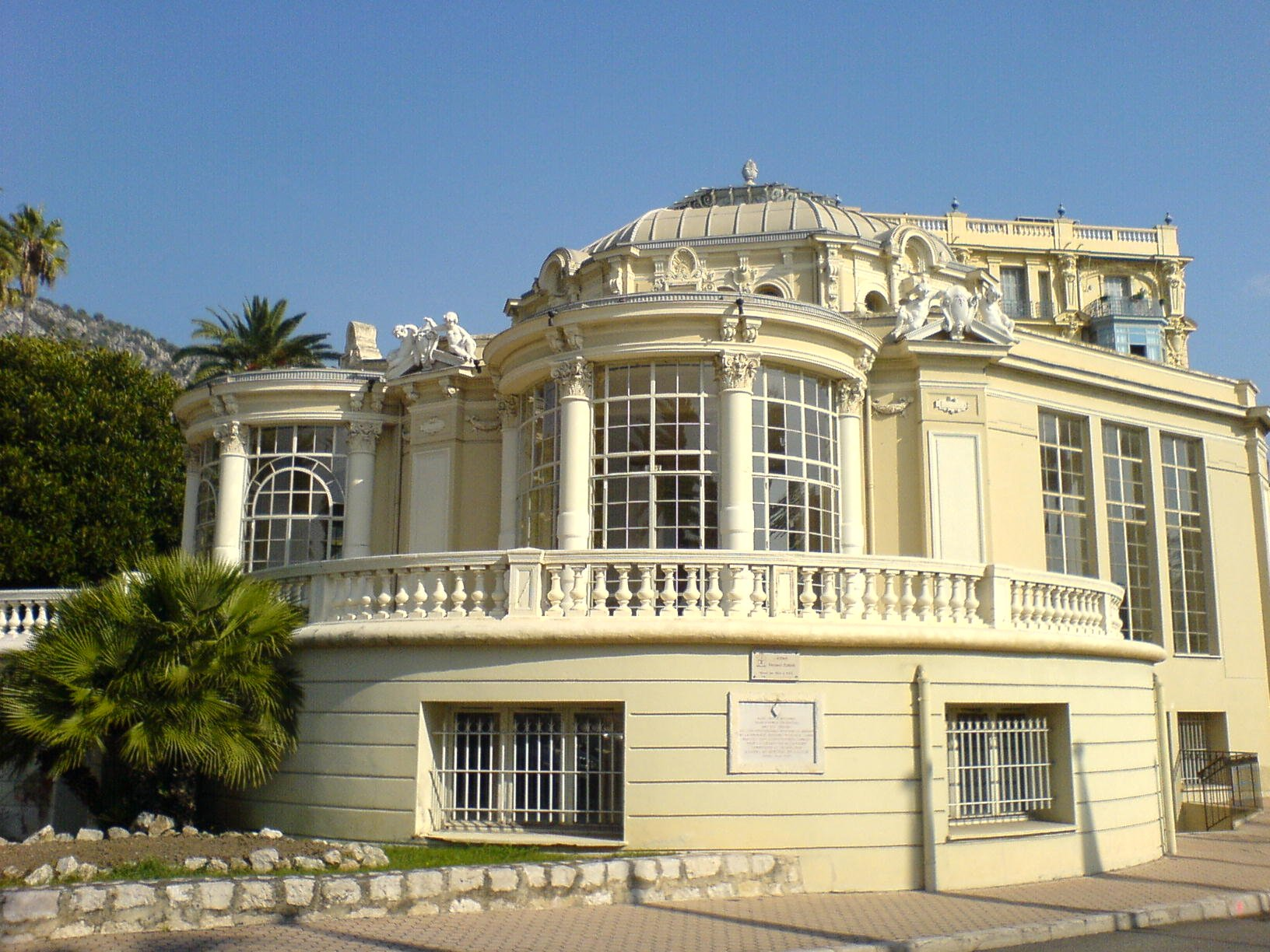
Congress Centre "La Rotonde"

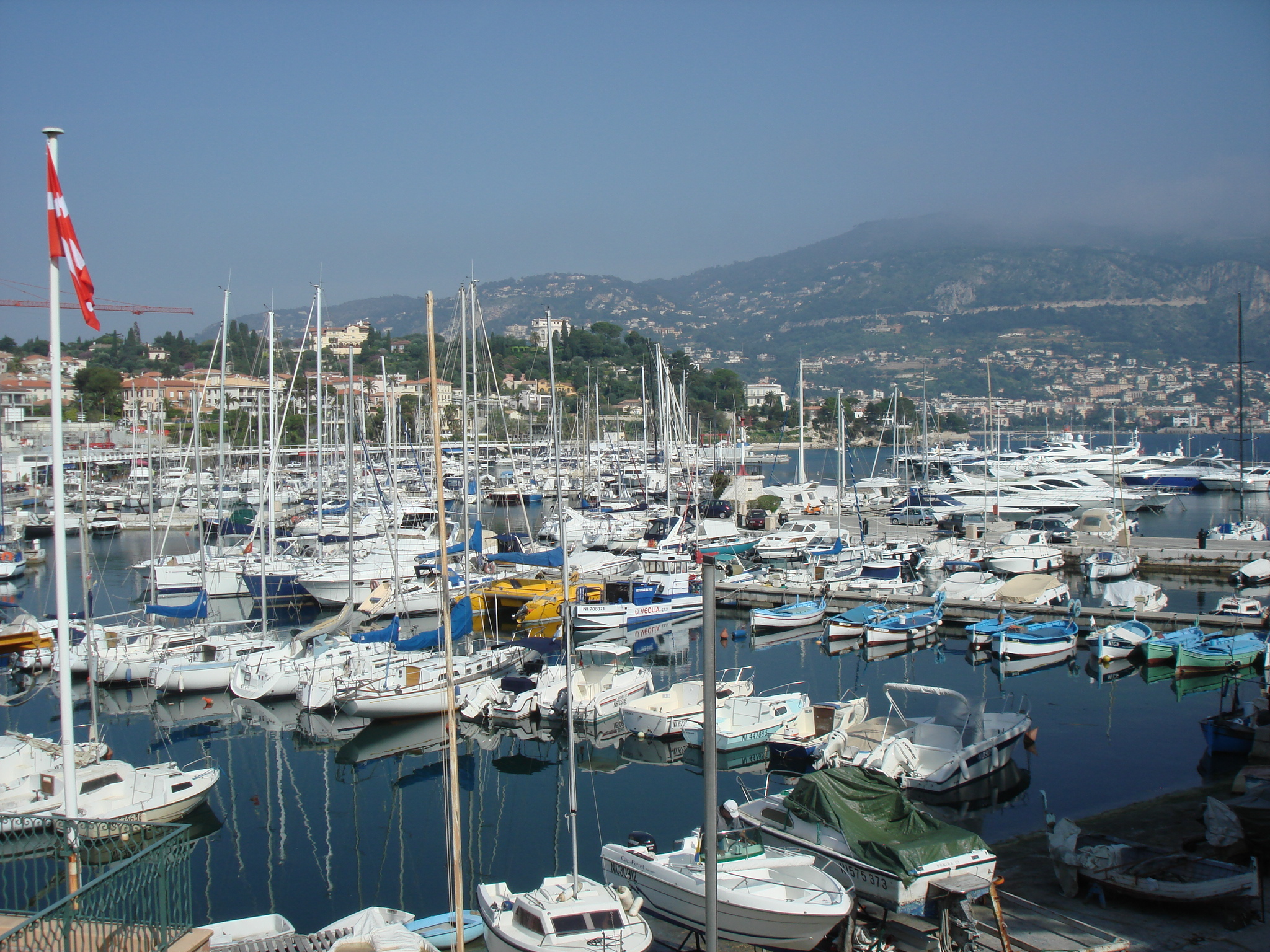
Marina of Beaulieu-sur-Mer

== See also ==
- Communes of the Alpes-Maritimes department
- Villa de May
