= Rajendra Bhandari =

Nepalese poet and academic

- Born: 1956 (age 69–70); Kalimpong, West Bengal, India
- Occupations: Poet, writer
- Writing career
- Language: Nepali

Rajendra Bhandari (born 1956) is an Indian Nepali-language poet and academic at the Sikkim Government College in Gangtok.

== Biography ==
Born in brahmin family of Kalimpong, 1956, Darjeeling district, Bhandari has lived in Gangtok since 1976. He is the son of Bhagirath Bhandari a prominent poet and an astrologer. He received a doctorate in Nepali literature from the University of North Bengal in 2002. He was an associate professor in the Nepali Department of the Sikkim Government College at Tadong in Gangtok from 1986 till his retirement in 2016. He has published several collections of poems in Nepali, the first of which appeared in 1979.

Bhandari has won awards for his poetry, including the 1981 Diyalo Purashkar in Poetry from the Nepali Sahitya Sammelan in Darjeeling, the 1998 Shiva Kumar Rai Memorial Award from the South Sikkim Sahitya Sammelan, the 1999 Dr. Shova Kanti Thegim Memorial Award for poetry, Sikkim State Government's Sahityashree Award, Bhanu Puraskar from Gangtok and Bhanu Puraskar from Darjeeling along with many other awards in India and Nepal. He participated in 17th World Poetry Festival, Berlin, in 2016 and World Poets Meet, Rome, in 2017, as a support base and solidarity towards the cause of Syrian refugees. He has extensively visited various places of India and Nepal reading his poems. Performed solo-recitations in Kathmandu, Nepal.

His poems deal with the pains and pangs of modern society, degrading cultural ethos including the search for rightful place of Indian Gorkha community in a vast Indian political arena.He has dealt with deep-ecological, ecospiritual urgencies for modern humanity at large.He has a deep concern for the spiritual liberation of man and has a deep knack towards Eastern spiritual wusdom.

== Bibliography ==
Each year links to its corresponding "[year] in poetry" article:

- 1979: Hiundey yee chisa raatka pardeharuma ("In the Veils of Cold Wintry Nights"), Gangtok, Sikkim: Padmakala Prakashan
- 1986: Yee shabdaharu: yee harafharu ("These Words: These Lines"), Gangtok, Sikkim: Jana Paksha Prakashan
- 1998: Kshar/Akshar ("Perishable/ Imperishable"), Gangtok, Sikkim: Jana Paksha Prakashan
