= Brian Moses =

Englist poet (born 1950)

Brian Moses (born 1950) is an English poet, percussionist and picture book writer. He mainly writes for children, has over 200 published works and is a children's poet. His poetry books and anthologies for Macmillan have sold in excess of 1 million copies. Moses was asked by CBBC to write a poem for the Queen's 80th birthday.

== Career ==
Moses was invited by Prince Charles to speak at the Prince's Summer School for Teachers at Cambridge University in July 2007. He was one of 10 children's poets invited by the then Poet Laureate, Andrew Motion, to feature in a website as part of the National Poetry Archive - launched in November 2005. He is also founder and co-director of a national Able Writers' Scheme administered by Authors Abroad.

== Music ==
Moses originally wanted to be a musician. That original musical influence can still be heard in his work; he performs so that pauses, tone of voice and speed become a central part of the poem, such as the hiss in "The Snake Hotel" or the Tom Waits growl in "Walking with my Iguana". This latter poem is featured on the Children's Poetry Archive. It has also been turned into a picture book.

== Awards ==
In 2005, Brian was nominated for both the CLPE Award and the Spoken Word Award.

In 2014, Brian's book 'The Monster Sale' won the Sheffield Children's Book Award.

== Bibliography (selected) ==
- Able Writers in Your School (co-written with Roger Stevens)
- Beetle in the Bathroom (Troika)
- Animal Pants (Macmillan)
- Lost Magic: The Very Best of Brian Moses (Macmillan 2016)
- Keeping Clear of Paradise Street: A Seaside Childhood in the 1950s (CandyJar Books, 2016)
- Dreamer - Saving Our Wild World, (OtterBarry picture book, 2016)
- 1066 & Before That: History Poems - written with Roger Stevens (Macmillan, 2016)
- Python (children's novel) (CandyJar Books)
- I Thought I Heard a Tree Sneeze (Troika, 2018)
- On Poetry Street (Scallywag Books)
- Snake in the Loft (CandyJar Book)
- The Incredible Shrinking Ghost (CandyJar Books)
- Trouble at the Dinosaur Cafe (Ventorros Press)
- Selfies With Komodos (Otter-Barry Books)
- Something Hiding Beneath My Bed (Candy Jar Books)
- The Best Ever Book of Funny Poems (editor, Macmillan)
- Walking With My Iguana (Troika Books)
- Dragons' Wood (Troika Books)
- Animal Pants! (Macmillan)
- Python (Candy Jar Books)
- Lost Magic (Macmillan)
- The Frog Olympics (Wayland)
