= Le Boulevard (Paris) =

1861–1863 weekly magazine

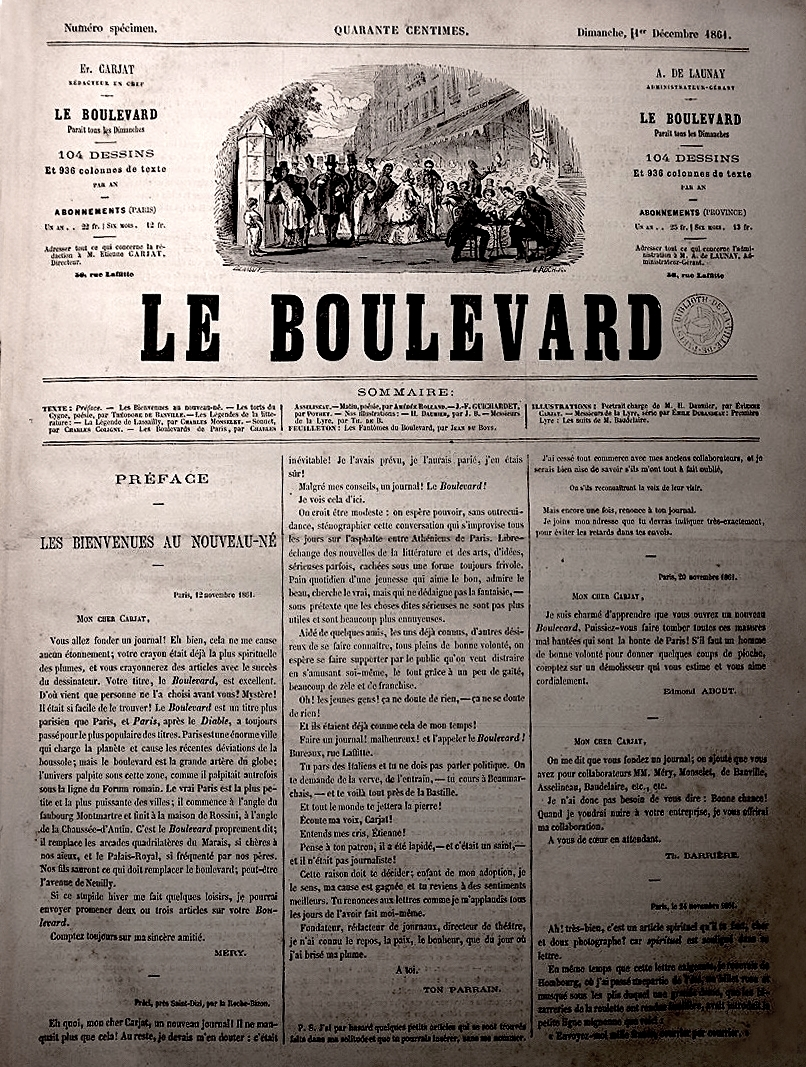
The first edition in 1861.

Le Boulevard was a weekly magazine published in Paris from 1861 to 1863.

It was founded and directed by Étienne Carjat and its first issue came out on December 1, 1861. Each issue included a Parisian column, a serialized story, and musical and gossip columns. It was printed on 8 large folio pages, 43–49 cm high, illustrated with two portraits. The editor was Alphonse de Launay.

Among the contributors to Le Boulevard were Charles Baudelaire, Gustave Flaubert, Victor Hugo, Champfleury, Jules Verne, Léon Cladel, and Honoré Daumier. The magazine dared to be critical of the government, notably publishing extracts from Hugo's Les Misérables in 1862.

The last issue was published on June 14, 1863. The end of the magazine was also financially disastrous for Carjat.
