= Emperor Shaka the Great =

1979 book by Mazisi Kunene

- Author: Mazisi Kunene
- Cover artist: Ingrid Crewdson
- Language: English
- Series: Heinemann African Writers Series
- Genre: Zulu heroic epic poetry
- Publication date: 1979
- Publication place: South Africa
- Pages: xxxvi + 438

Emperor Shaka the Great is an epic poem based on the Zulu oral tradition, compiled in Zulu then translated by South African poet Mazisi Kunene and published in 1979 in the Heinemann African Writers Series. The poem follows the life of Shaka Zulu, documenting his exploits as a king of the Zulu people, who produced considerable advances in State structure and military technologies of the Zulu. Some critics express concern over the historicity of the retelling. However, Kunene's embrace of an African perspective on Shaka's rule expresses an attempt at understanding the apparent horrors observed by Europeans in the history of Shaka.

== Oral tradition ==
Though the Zulu had practised considerable oral poetry from early in the history, the Zulu heroic epic was not fully developed until the reign of Shaka. This poem represents the national tradition of recording the rule of Shaka through many official historians specializing in one particular part of Shaka's history. In Zulu tradition, the poets (izimbongi) are definers of social values and celebrators of the nation and its successes. One expert, commenting on Kunene's work, said "the oral traditions of the Zulus these are not memorized stories ... These are re-creations, re-creations in terms of the present. Kunene was masterful at that." The Culture Sector of UNESCO sanctions the book as a representative translation of Zulu literature.

== Characters ==
- Shaka Zulu
- Senzangakhona – Shaka's father and king of the Zulu
- Nandi – Shaka's mother
- Mkhabayi – Shaka's aunt and regent before the rule of Senzangakhona

== Plot ==
The epic follows the life narrative of Shaka the Great and is narrated from a third person perspective. The book begins with the apparently legitimate love affair of Nandi with Shaka's father Senzangakhona. However, Senzangakhona mistreats Nandi, and drives her from the Zulu kingdom. She flees the kingdom and spends many years travelling among kingdoms friendly to her own tribe. While abroad she gives birth to Shaka and raises him. They finally settle in the kingdom where Shaka grows, quickly showing himself as having a sharp mind and military prowess. He gains command of his own regiment, which he retrains in a new fighting system. Instead of fighting with throwing spears from afar, which was the traditional method of warfare, Shaka suggested that a large shield and a short stabbing spear should be used. His strategy relied on a quick approach to the enemy under cover of the shield so as to stab the enemy before the enemy could throw many spears.

Shaka earns a reputation as both a fighter and warrior. When Senzangakhona dies, Shaka, with pardon of the King whose kingdom he has lived in, leads a military force into Zululand. Soldiers and the populace flock to this great warrior and Shaka ascends to the throne, usurping his more legitimate brothers. With his ascension to the throne Shaka radically reorganizes the military system. With this new organization and the tactics he perfected with the short spear, Shaka begins expanding into neighbouring regions, suppressing kings and bandit armies and assimilating these peoples into the Zulu nation.

Soon, the first white people come in contact with the Zulus led by a man named King. Though Shaka does not totally trust these people, he allows them to settle in a small part of his land so that he can learn about their ways. He also sends an uncle as a mission to King George of the United Kingdom. Meanwhile, Shaka's mother, Nandi, dies and Shaka declares a national year of mourning. As the nation mourns, the economy begins to fall apart. Finally Shaka is persuaded to allow everyone to replant the fields and have children.

Gradually, Shaka's brothers and Aunts become frustrated with his rule and plot to overthrow him. One of Shaka's most trusted advisers agrees to help them, and they kill Shaka while he is holding court.

== Themes ==
Kunene's approach to the Shaka epic appears to represent the position of the Zulu aristocracy during his rule. The book focuses more on the tension and conflicts of the political elite than on the greater welfare and interest of the people.

Kunene's Emperor Shaka also seeks to delve into the greater psychological motivations which could have driven Shaka to certain deeds which are perceived by western historians as violent or immoral. This means to express the values that African rulers should embrace in their leadership. John Haynes suggests that the events of the ANC's fight against Apartheid during Kunene's composition of the poem allow the book to also act as a model for how black Africans, or at least black South Africans, can rule themselves using African values, using a "top-down populism".

== Reception ==
Many critics point out that Kunene's approach to the subject is not historiographically accurate. For example, Mbongeni Malaba, in his review in Research in African Literatures suggests that the book was simply a praise of Shaka, ignoring all the other great individuals of the period and Shaka's failings. Malaba calls this book a "glorious technicolor," describing how beautiful Kunene makes the tale of Shaka However, John Haynes suggests that many of these changes to historiographic approach are a result of portraying the "tension between Shaka's creativity and his destructiveness" from an aristocratic point of view and embodying Zulu values. Thus Kunene's "Africanist" approach is more of a delve into how the Zulu political leaders of Shaka's time saw Shaka's rule.

== Publication history ==
The first edition of Emperor Shaka was published by William Heinemann Ltd in 1979 as part of the African Writers Series. After its publication, the book was distributed to ANC guerrillas as a source of inspiration in their struggle against the apartheid government. The book was later reprinted by William Heinemann Ltd in 1984, 1986, 1993. The 1993 edition (ISBN 0-435-90211-3, xxxvi+ 438 pp.) was printed in paperback in association with East African Educational Publishers.
