= Aifric Mac Aodha =

Irish poet and editor

Aifric Mac Aodha (born 1979) is an Irish poet and writer. Working mainly in the Irish language, she is an editor with An Gúm.

== Biography ==
A native of Dublin, Mac Aodha first book, Gabháil Syrinx was published in 2010. She has edited Comhar, The Stinging Fly and Poetry Ireland's Trumpet. She works as an assistant editor with An Gúm.
