= Jehan de Paris =

Late 15th-century French prose romance

Jehan de Paris (sometimes modernized as Jean de Paris) is an anonymous prose romance written at the end of the 15th century, probably around the years 1494–1495.

== Date ==
It is thought to have been written around 1495 insofar as the author is inspired by the reign of Charles VIII of France, and in particular by the military campaigns carried out by him in Italy.

== Synopsis ==
The story begins with an episode in the life of the king of France, father of the titular hero Jehan of Paris. The king of France saves the king of Spain from a bad political situation, and the two sovereigns swear to marry their respective children to each other.

The king, father of Jehan of Paris dies, the Spanish sovereigns forget this promise and betroth Princess Anne to the king of England. Jehan of Paris, who in turn becomes King, is informed by his mother of the oath and decides to enforce it. He prepares his army, and, concealing his true identity, heads toward the Spanish town of Burgues.

On the way, Jehan of Paris crosses the path of the king of England whom he ridicules with a few verbal tricks. Then follows the splendid entry of Jehan into Burgues, recalling the entries of Charles VIII into Florence and Naples during the victories of the Italian campaign. The Spaniards and the king of England are dazzled by so much pomp. Jehan falls in love with Anne of Spain, conquers everyone's hearts with his presence and magnificence at the reception, reveals his identity and marries Anne, thus fulfilling the promise of their fathers.

== Manuscripts and prints ==
Two manuscripts of Jehan de Paris are known: Louvain, Bibliothèque, G. 54, and Paris, Bibliothèque nationale de France, français, 1465. Both date from the 16th century. A third, Swiss, manuscript was reported in 1853, but its location is now unknown. The earliest known prints – those of 1533, 1534 and undated – were all published in Lyon.

== Modern editions ==
It was edited by Édith Wickersheimer as Le roman de Jehan de Paris (Paris, 1923). The edition by Albert Pauphilet, Le roman de Jehan de Paris (Lyon, 1931), was later included in his Poètes et romanciers du Moyen Âge (Paris, 1939; 2nd edition, 1952).

== English translation ==
- The Romance of Jehan de Paris: Le Romant de Jehan de Paris. Studies in French Literature, 15. Translated by Mermier, Guy R. Lewiston, NY: Mellen Press. 1993. ISBN 0773492259.

== Sources ==
- Brun, Laurent (11 August 2020). "Le roman de Jehan de Paris". Les Archives de littérature du Moyen Âge (ARLIMA) (in French).
