= Peter de Francia =

Italian-British painter (1921–2012)

Peter Laurent de Francia
- Born: 25 January 1921; Beaulieu-sur-Mer, Alpes Maritimes, France
- Died: 19 January 2012 (aged 90); London, UK
- Known for: Painting, drawing
- Notable work: The Execution of Beloyannis (1953); Portrait of Eric Hobsbawm (1955); The Bombing of Sakiet (1959); The Emigrants (1964); Ship of Fools (1985)

Peter Laurent de Francia (25 January 1921 – 19 January 2012) was an Italian-British artist, who was Professor of Painting at the Royal College of Art (RCA), London, from 1972 to 1986. His paintings and drawing are included in art collections in Britain, and he was the author of two books on Fernand Léger, Leger: The Great Parade (Painters on Painting) (1969) and Fernand Léger (1983), and of several articles on art.

Influenced by nineteenth-century socialist painters such as Gustave Courbet and Honoré Daumier, as well as by socially committed artists of his time like Renato Guttuso, Pablo Picasso, Max Beckmann and George Grosz, de Francia used subjects that exposed the contradictions in everyday life to try to inspire change.

== Biography ==
De Francia was born in Beaulieu-sur-Mer Alpes Maritimes, France to an Italian father, Laurent Fernand de Francia, and an English mother, Alice Groom. He grew up in Paris and was educated at Paris's American school, followed by studies in art at the Academy of Brussels (1938–40), and after settling in London, at the Slade School of Fine Art, University of London, in the years 1945-1948.

He worked at the Canadian Government Exhibition Commission in Ottawa (1949–1950) and in the Architects' Department of the American Museum in New York City (1950–1951). From 1953 to 1968, he was a tutor in the Department of Art History and Complementary Studies at St Martin's School of Art, London (1953–1968), and from 1963 to 1969 also tutored in the Department of Art History and Complementary Studies at the Royal College of Art (RCA). He was Principal of the Department of Fine Art, Goldsmiths' College, University of London (1969–72), and from 1972 to 1986 was Professor of Painting at the RCA.

He is buried on the eastern side of Highgate Cemetery.

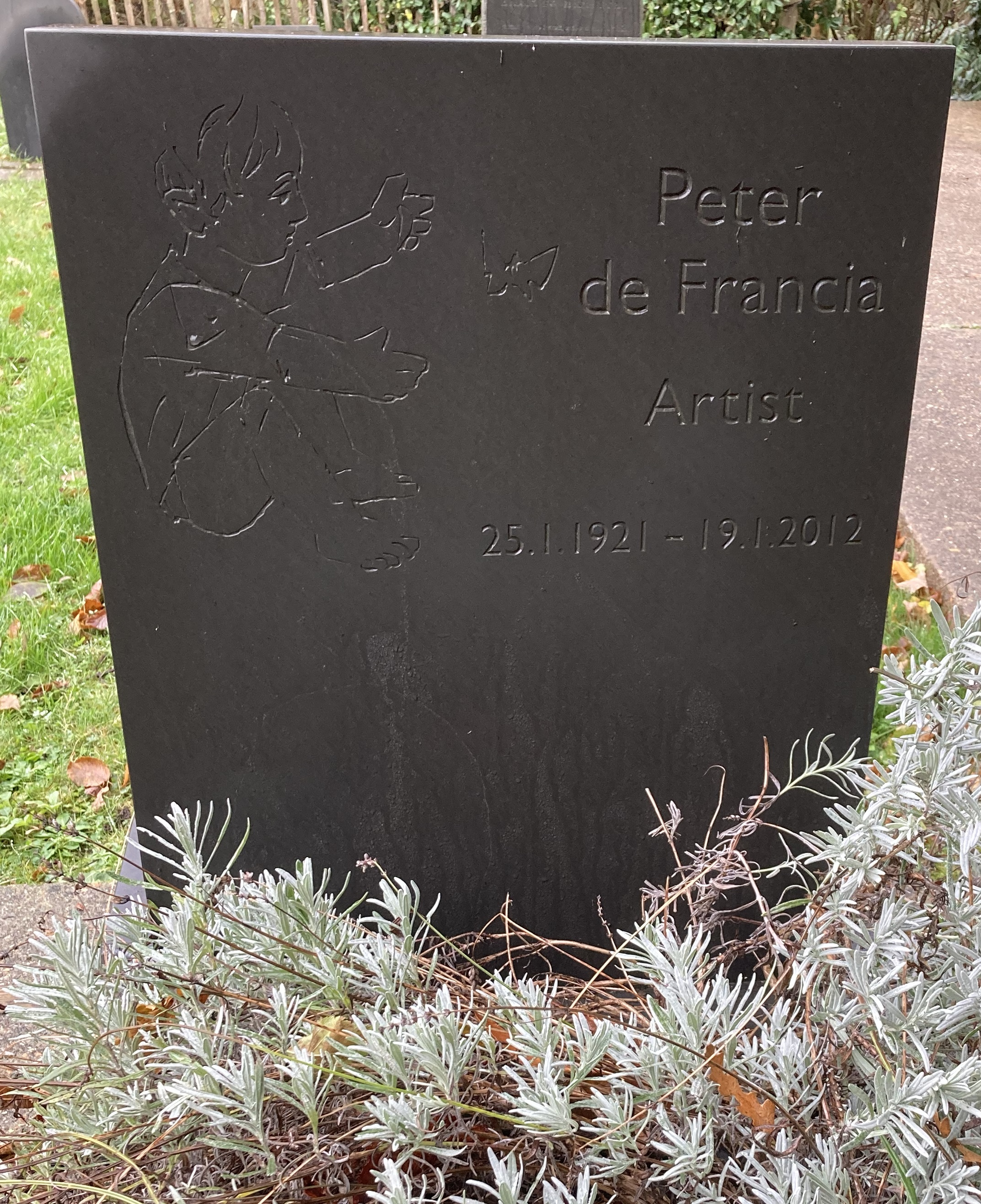
Grave of Peter de Francia in Highgate Cemetery

== Selected exhibitions ==
- 2012 - Peter de Francia. An Intimate View, James Hyman Gallery, London
- 2011 - Peter de Francia. Paintings: A 90th Birthday Retrospective, James Hyman Gallery, London
- 2009 - Peter de Francia. Art World Drawings, James Hyman Gallery, London
- 2008 - Modern Myths, New York Studio School (catalogue), New York
- 2007-08 - The Ship of Fools: Peter de Francia in Focus, Pallant House, Chichester
- 2006 - Peter de Francia, Tate Britain (brochure, interview by Philip Dodd), London
- 2005 - After the Bombing, James Hyman Gallery, London
- 2004 - Drawings, The Gallery, Wimbledon School of Art, London
- 2002 - Peter de Francia: Fables and Other Drawings: 1990-2001, Queen's Gallery, British Council, New Delhi, India
- 1999 - Peter de Francia: Drawings, Ruskin School, Oxford
  - Peter de Francia: Ballets Africains: Drawings, The Place, London
- 1996 - Peter de Francia: Drawings 1993-96, Austin/Desmond Fine Art, London
- 1995 - Peter de Francia, Gloria Gallery, Nicosia, Cyprus
- 1991 - Peter de Francia, Centre for Contemporary Art, New Delhi, India
- 1987 - Peter de Francia: Paintings and drawings, Graves Art Gallery, Sheffield
- 1989 - Peter de Francia: Untitled, Frith Street Gallery, London
- 1990 - Peter de Francia, Pomeroy Purdy Gallery, London
- 1987 - Peter de Francia: Retrospective, Camden Arts Centre, London
- 1983 - Peter de Francia, Forum Gallery, New York
- 1980 - Peter de Francia, New Art Centre, London
- 1978 - Peter de Francia, Gallery of the Institute of Cultural Relations, Budapest, Hungary
- 1977 - Peter de Francia: Retrospective, Camden Arts Centre, London & New 57 Gallery, Edinburgh
- 1976 - Peter de Francia, New Art Centre, London
- 1969 - Peter de Francia, New 57 Gallery, Edinburgh
- 1962 - Peter de Francia, Forum Gallery, New York
- 1962 - Peter de Francia, Gallery of the Union of Czech Writers, Prague
- 1961 - Peter de Francia, Galerie d'Eendt, Amsterdam, the Netherlands
- 1959 - Peter de Francia, Colonna Gallery, Milan, Italy
- 1958 - Peter de Francia, Waddington Galleries, London (catalogue)
  - Peter de Francia, Colonna Gallery, Milan, Italy.

== Selected publications ==
- Impressionism, Methuen & Co., 1956. 62 pp
- The Great Parade (Painters on Painting). Worthing: Little Hampton Book Services Ltd, 1969. 32 pp. ISBN 0304932779.
- Fernand Léger, New Haven: Yale University Press, 1983. 288 pp. ISBN 0300030673.
- Peter de Francia: Fables, Maruts Press, 2002. ISBN 0954305205
- Peter de Francia Portraits, James Hyman Fine Art, 2006.
