= Louis Émile Benassit =

French painter and lithographer (1833–1902)

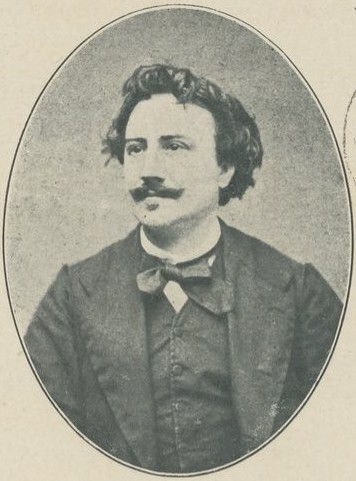
- Born: 20 December 1833; Bordeaux, France
- Died: 9 August 1902 (aged 68); Jouarre, France
- Other names: spelling variants: Louis-Émile, Bénassit, Bénàssit
- Education: François-Édouard Picot
- Occupations: painter; illustrator; caricaturist.
- Known for: caricature; illustration; paintings and water-colors depicting soldiers of the Franco-Prussian War
- Works: Absinthe! (1862); Les heures parisiennes (1866)

Signature
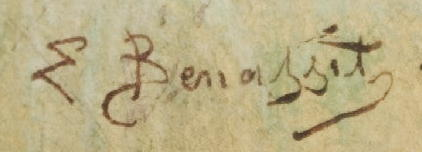

Louis Émile Benassit (20 December 1833 – 9 August 1902) was a French artist and raconteur. He cut a colorful figure in the literary and artistic circles of Paris in the 1860s and 1870s, known equally for his satirical drawings and for his barbed wit. His updated versions of the fables of La Fontaine were widely reported in the French press. After his own military service in the Franco-Prussian War of 1870, he frequently depicted soldiers, often enduring snow or inclement weather. Eventually, thanks in part to the influential art dealer Paul Durand-Ruel, his work began to fetch high prices; Benassit's depictions of courtiers and ladies of the 1700s became especially popular. But beginning in 1882, a progressive paralysis that started in his right arm cut short both his career and his appearances in café society, though by at least one account he learned to paint using his left hand. The last twelve years of his life were spent in relative seclusion away from Paris.

== Education, early career, café society in Paris ==
Benassit was born in Bordeaux to a French father and English mother, was taken at a young age to London, and returned to France to study painting in Paris under François-Édouard Picot. He made his debut at the Paris Salon of 1859 with a painting entitled Clair de Lune. From 1859 to 1888, he would exhibit thirteen works at the annual Salons.

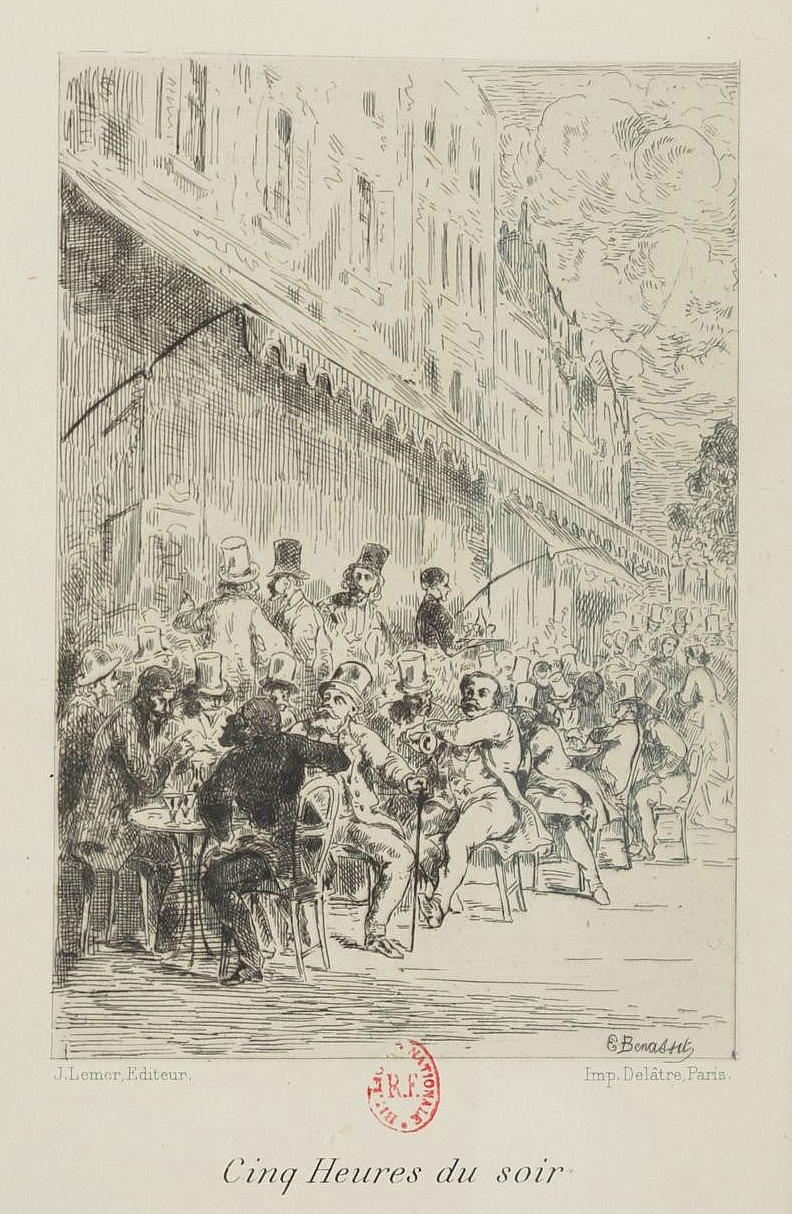
Café society: "Cinq heures de soir," one of 25 illustrations by Benassit for Les heures parisiennes by Alfred Delvau, 1866.

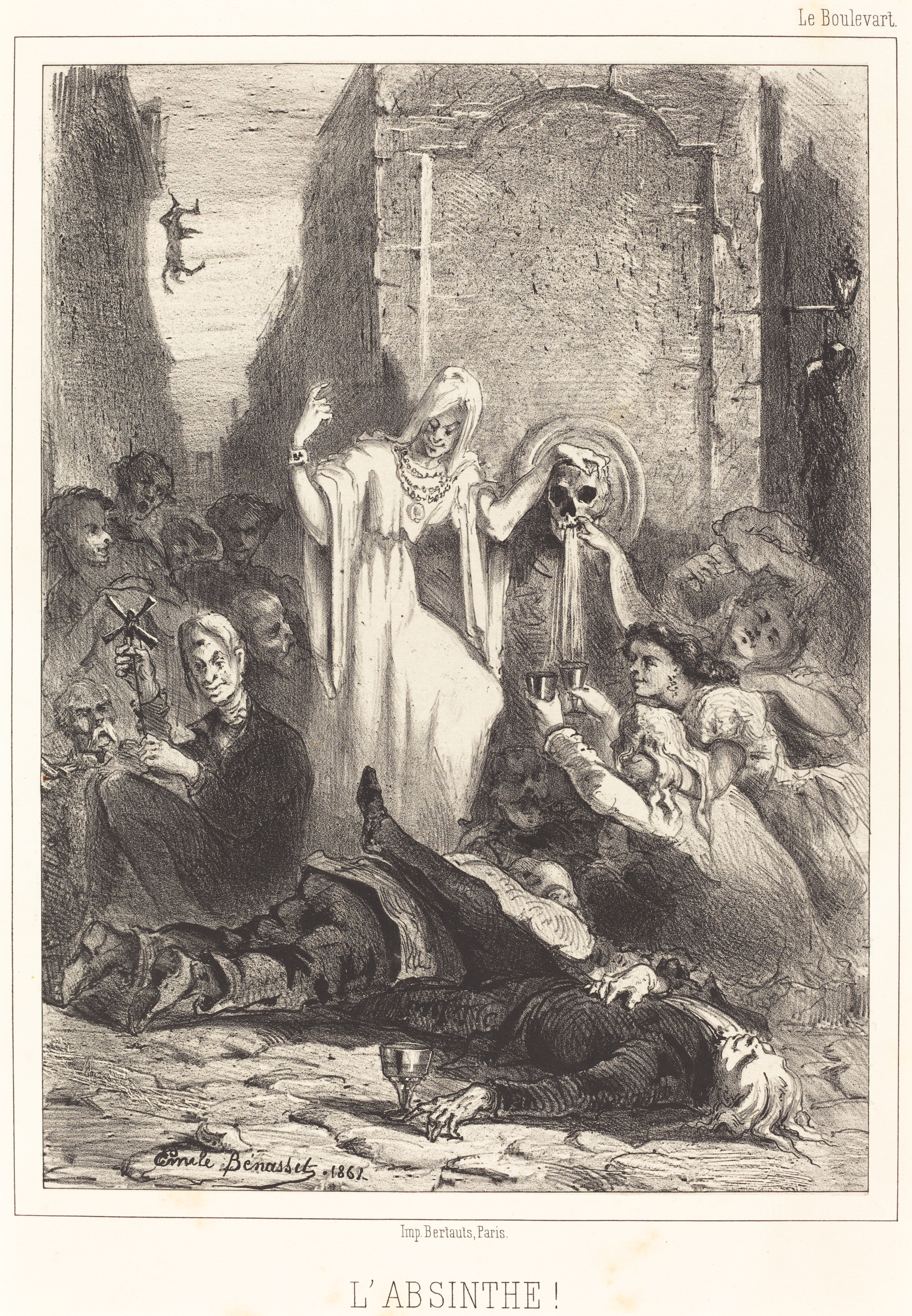
L'Absinthe!, 1862, National Gallery of Art.

In the 1860s, having spent his inheritance, Benassit turned to the publishing world to make ends meet and became a prolific caricaturist and illustrator for periodicals and books. He provided illustrations for Paul Arène's Jean-des-Figues, Alphonse Daudet's Tartarin, Alfred Delvau's Du pont des Arts au pont de Kehl, Alcide Dusolier's Propos littéraires et pittoresques de Jean de La Martrille, Louis Figuier's Vies des savants illustres du dix-septieme siècle, Félix Hément's Menu Propos sur les Sciences and La Toilette d'Alice, and Charles Monselet's Les créanciers: oeuvre de vengeance.

Jules-Antoine Castagnary gave high praise to Benassit's 25 illustrations (one for each hour of the day, plus a frontispiece) for Alfred Delvau's Les heures parisiennes, saying the artist, a "Parisian (not by birth, but by temperament and mentality)" displayed "all the finesse and all the crumpled grace that can be possessed by a pretty pencil-line subject to an expeditious hand. Fantasy and observation mingle in Bénassit's work, with that sort of shadowy elegance that adapts so well to the depiction of our diverse demi-mondes. No one knows better than he how to raise a skirt around two little trotting feet, nor to maliciously roll up a nose in the middle of a beggar's face. What charming pages to flip through!" Before it was published, censors tried (and failed) to ban the book.

Benassit produced several original watercolors for an extra-illustrated edition of Aloysius Bertrand's prose-poem collection Gaspard de la Nuit, published by Pincebourde in 1868, now in the collection of the Bibliothèque patrimoniale et d'étude de Dijon.

Benassit also produced a number of notable lithographs, including (for the first issue of Carjat's Le Boulevard in 1861) Maître Courbet inaugurant l'atelier des peintres modernes, and also the allegorical series Le Vin, L'Eau-de-Vie, and L'Absinthe!, "which Baudelaire and Murger declared pure masterpieces."

During this period Benassit moved in the Left Bank literary circles that included Paul Arène, Hippolyte Babou, Charles Bataille, Léon Cladel, Alphonse Daudet, Alfred Delvau, Georges Duval, Alphonse Duchesne, Albert Glatigny, Louis Lemercier de Neuville, Charles Monselet, Henri Murger, and Aurélien Scholl. Benassit induced the circle of photographer and poet Étienne Carjat to join his group at the Café de Madrid; and "according to legend, he sometimes met at the café in the Rue des Martyrs with Baudelaire."

Paul Arène vividly described the young Benassit and his ability to amuse and enthrall listeners:

Small but strong, stocky and broad of face, high-spirited and strong-willed, with a pile of curly hair that gave him a Byronic air—when Bénassit entered, invariably followed by Sprinn, his faithful terrier, we gathered. And there were endless stories, anecdotes delivered by the basketful: his student days boarding with Pils, and the beautiful and abominable studio pranks his fellows played on him; and, from further back, the strange childhood of a little Frenchman brought up in London: the icy courtyard of his college, where gallophobic school children encircled him, leaping and shouting "Waterloo! Waterloo!"—and the little French boy, his national pride wounded, but not strong enough for revenge, going slyly every day for months to a hovel on the banks of the Thames, learning to box at the house of a boxer's widow, a toothless old witch, tall and stringy, who knelt to be at his height and pummeled his chest with clenched fists as yellow and hard as boxwood roots.

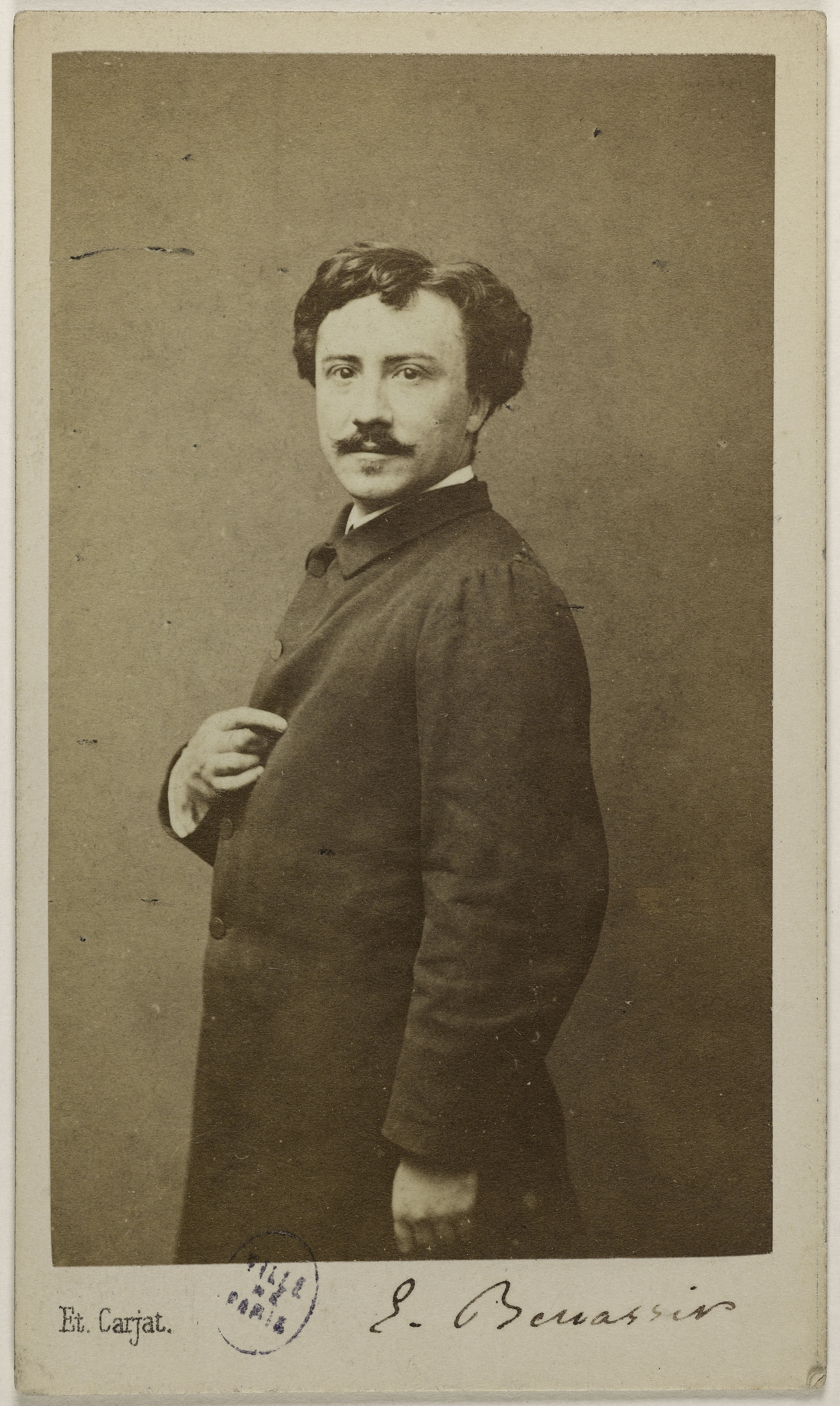
Portrait of Benassit by Carjat, Musee Carnavalet.

Étienne Carjat gives another description in his poem "Émile Benassit," dated 1869:

Short in stature, a bit stocky,
Square forehead, bushy hair,
The half-closed eye of a well-sated cat,
Wide chin and mouth that laughs...
His incisive and cold mind
suavely sharpens sarcasm...
In the madcap supper-hour,
He shows a strange tenderness...
He becomes almost benevolent;
We listen, admire, love him
Until morning, when waking,
He thinks only of himself.

The journalist Maxime Rude remembered the young Benassit as

...short, stocky and already quite plump. The brown eyes were lively and sharp; the forehead, which lighted up at times, betrayed an irascible nature; the smile sparkled with mischief; the lips, which twisted a bit at one corner when he spoke, were charged with irony or bitterness. And some of Bénassit's words did in fact spring from bitterness or irony; others were quite cheerful, delivering what studio slang calls "la blague" (a joke)...

== Spoofs and caricatures ==
Benassit became a master of the caricature—and was himself the object of spoofing and caricature in the freewheeling French press.

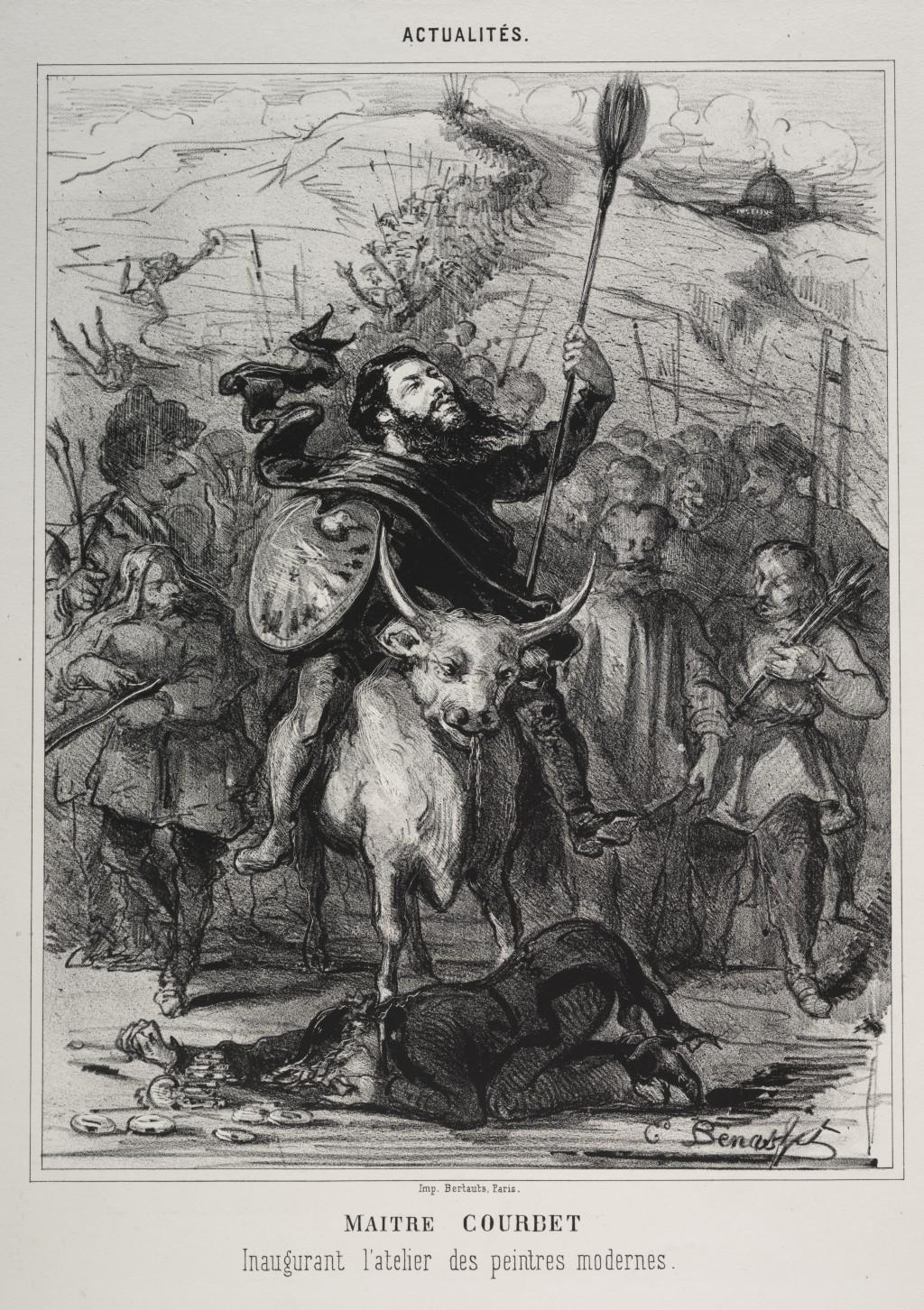
Benassit's Maître Courbet inaugurant l'atelier des peintres modernes, 1861, Cleveland Museum of Art

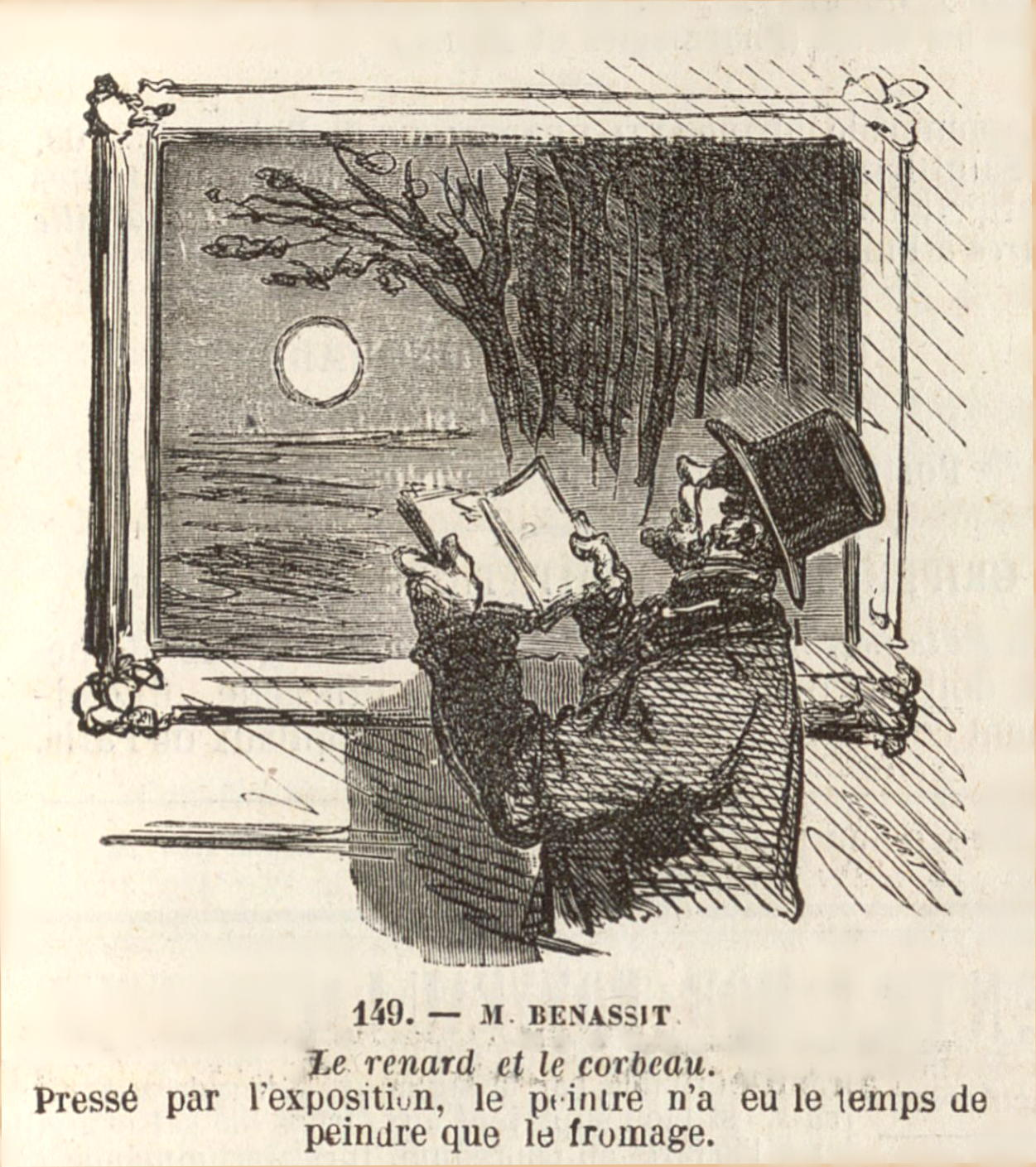
"Promenades au Salon" by Cham spoofed paintings at the 1865 Paris Salon, including Benassit's Clair de Lune.

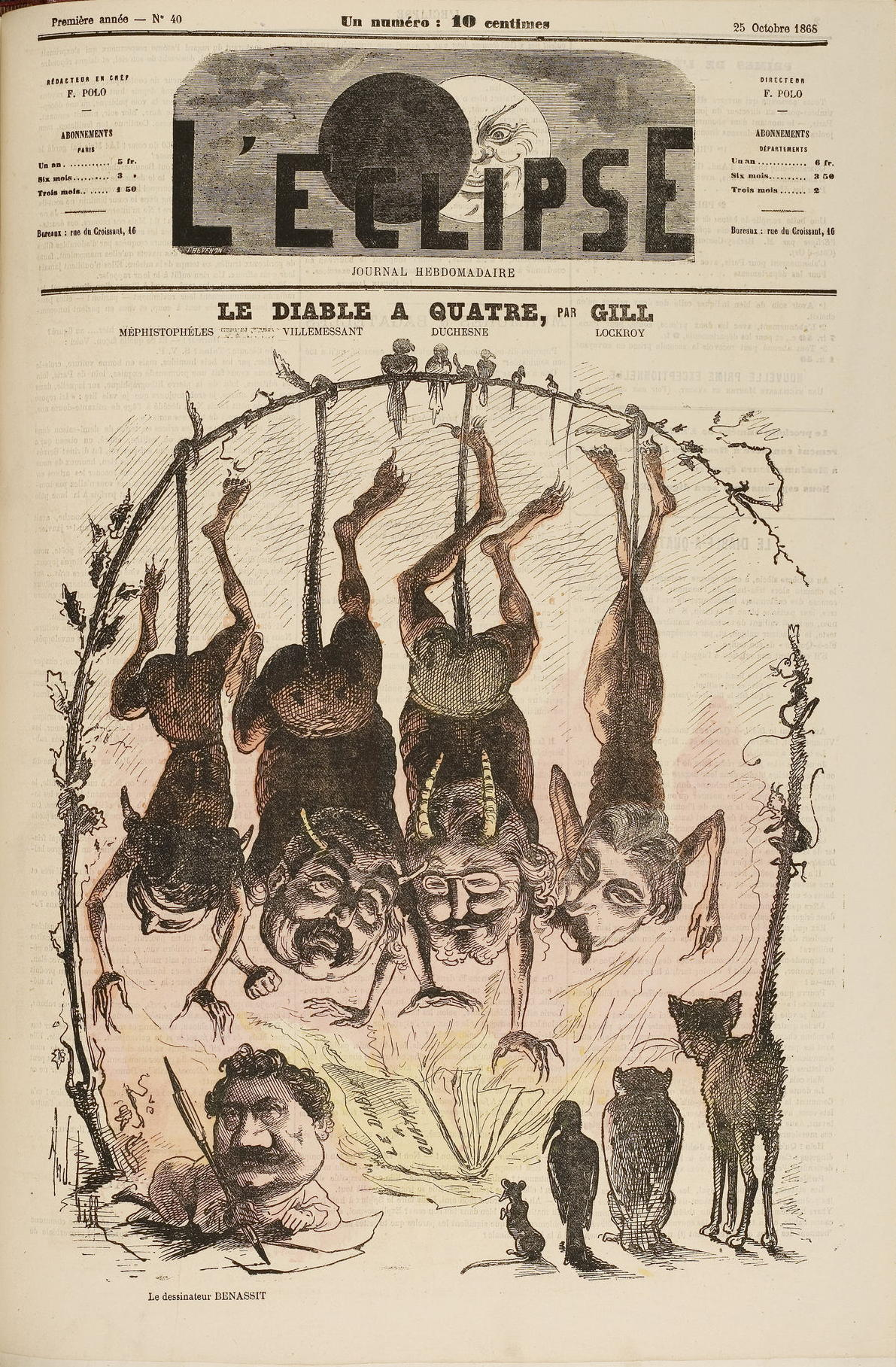
L'Eclipse, 25 Oct. 1868, notes the debut of the satirical journal Le Diable à Quatre with caricatures of its four editors (including Mephistopheles)—and illustrator Émile Benassit.

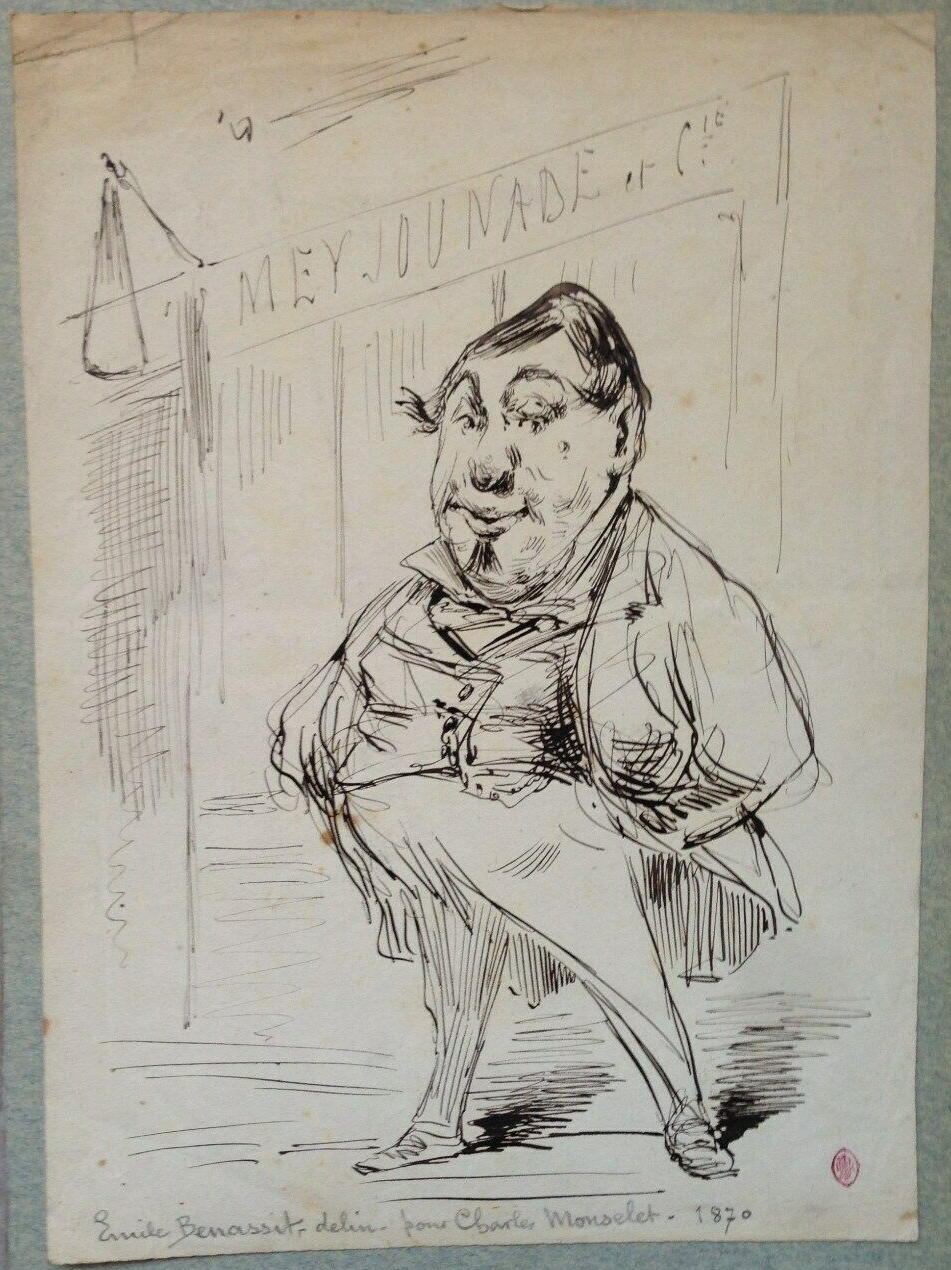
Meyjounade et Cie, caricature by Benassit for Charles Monselet, 1870, private collection

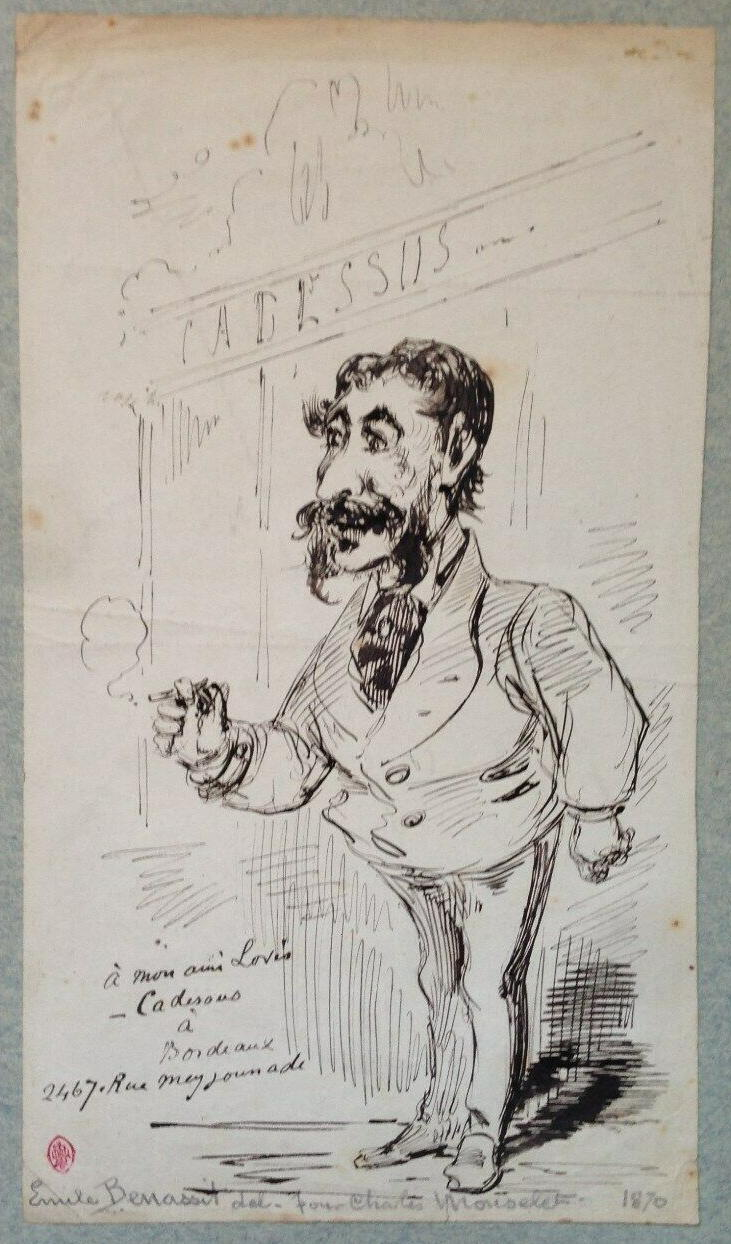
Cadesous à Bordeaux, caricature by Benassit for Charles Monselet, 1870, private collection

== The fables of Benassit ==
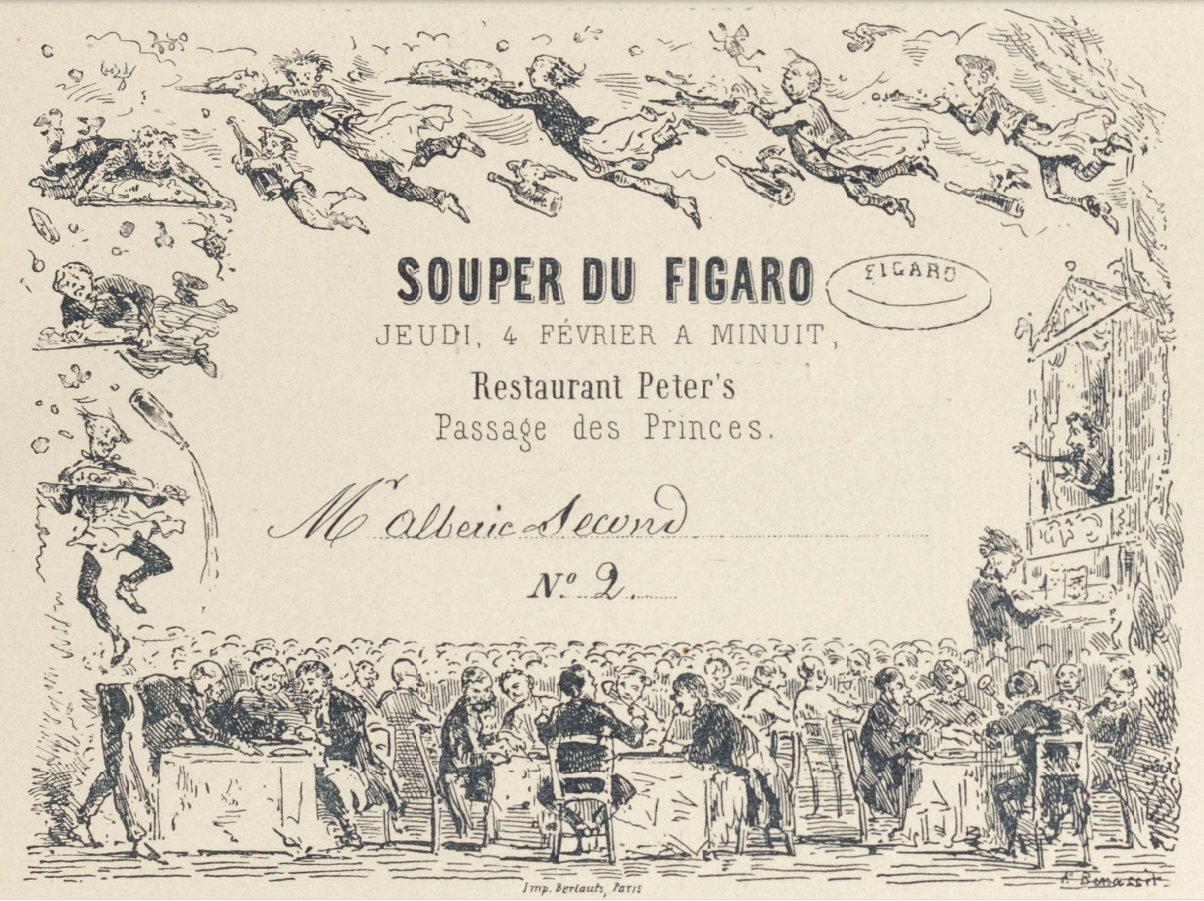
Invitation to a midnight supper hosted by the publication Le Figaro in Paris, 1864 or 1869; art by Benassit. At right: puppeteer Louis Lemercier de Neuville, who recounts some of Benassit's fables in his memoirs.

Benassit achieved particular notoriety for his retellings of the fables of La Fontaine, with sly topical references, word-play, and Gallic wit that defy translation. Though friends begged him to do so, Benassit never made a book of his fables, and so, quipped Paul Arène, like "the songs of the Homerides, they are passed on from mouth to mouth through the generations." Benassit's fables were recounted by numerous journalists, memoirists, and obituary writers. Arène cited Benassit's version of the dog that let go of its prey:

A dog steals a steak. Passing over a bridge, he sees his reflection in the water: “What! Another dog with another steak! And his steak is bigger than mine! What if I take it from him? Ah, but this dog is also bigger than me. Let's eat our steak first; then we'll fight." The dog goes away to eat his steak, comes back, sees his image again in the water and cries: "Amazing! The other dog had the same idea as me!"

The puppeteer Louis Lemercier de Neuville, who recounts a number of these fables in his memoirs, recalls them as "the joy of the ateliers and the artistic and literary meetings. His way of telling them contributed greatly to their success; he said the funniest things, imparted with utmost seriousness, in a half-English, half-Gascon accent that doubled their hilarity." Georges Duval writes of Benassit's English sense of humor.

== Franco-Prussian War of 1870–1871 ==
In 1870, when the enemy laid siege to Paris during the Franco-Prussian War, Benassit put on uniform and served, along with many other writers and artists, in the 61st Battalion of the National Guard, based in Montmartre. Even under such circumstances, Benassit's prankish nature was irrepressible. His friend the writer Charles Monselet later admitted to having been a less than exemplary soldier, often missing the morning roll call. When Monselet's name was called out, and silence followed, Benassit would step forward, present his arms, and gravely intone: "Mort au champ d'honneur!" ("Death on the field of honor!") When Monselet later told this story on lecture tour, it never failed to get a laugh from the audience.

But the war, or more specifically its soldiers, clearly made a deep impression on Benassit. In the following decade he returned again and again to making watercolors and paintings of men in uniform, often on scouting missions or in retreat, and often in snow or rain. Benassit's often somber depictions are neither sentimental nor graphically violent; Charles Chincholle wrote that Benassit "shows us the ardor, the valor. He hides the price of glory under the frame."

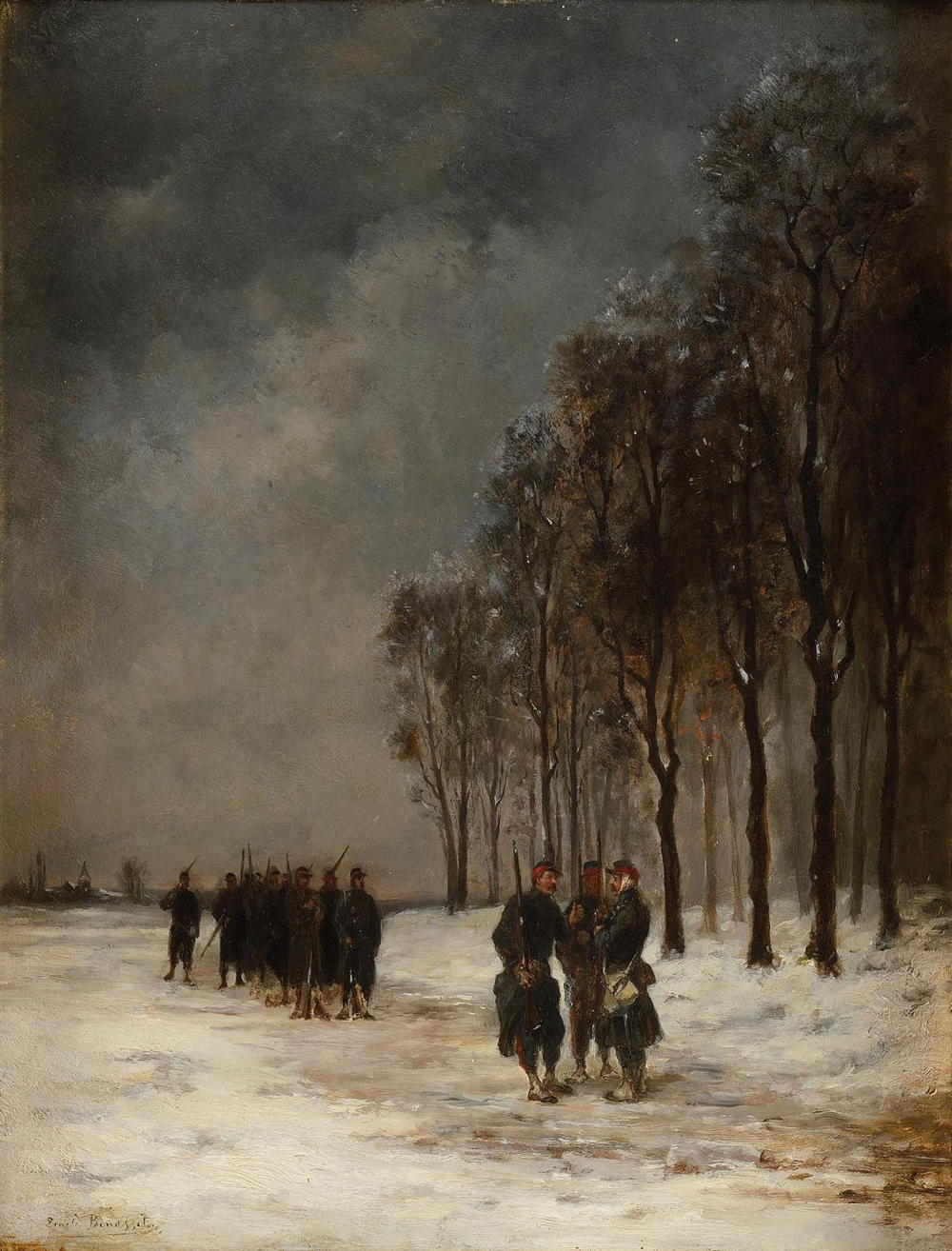
French soldiers during the winter of 1870, n.d., private collection

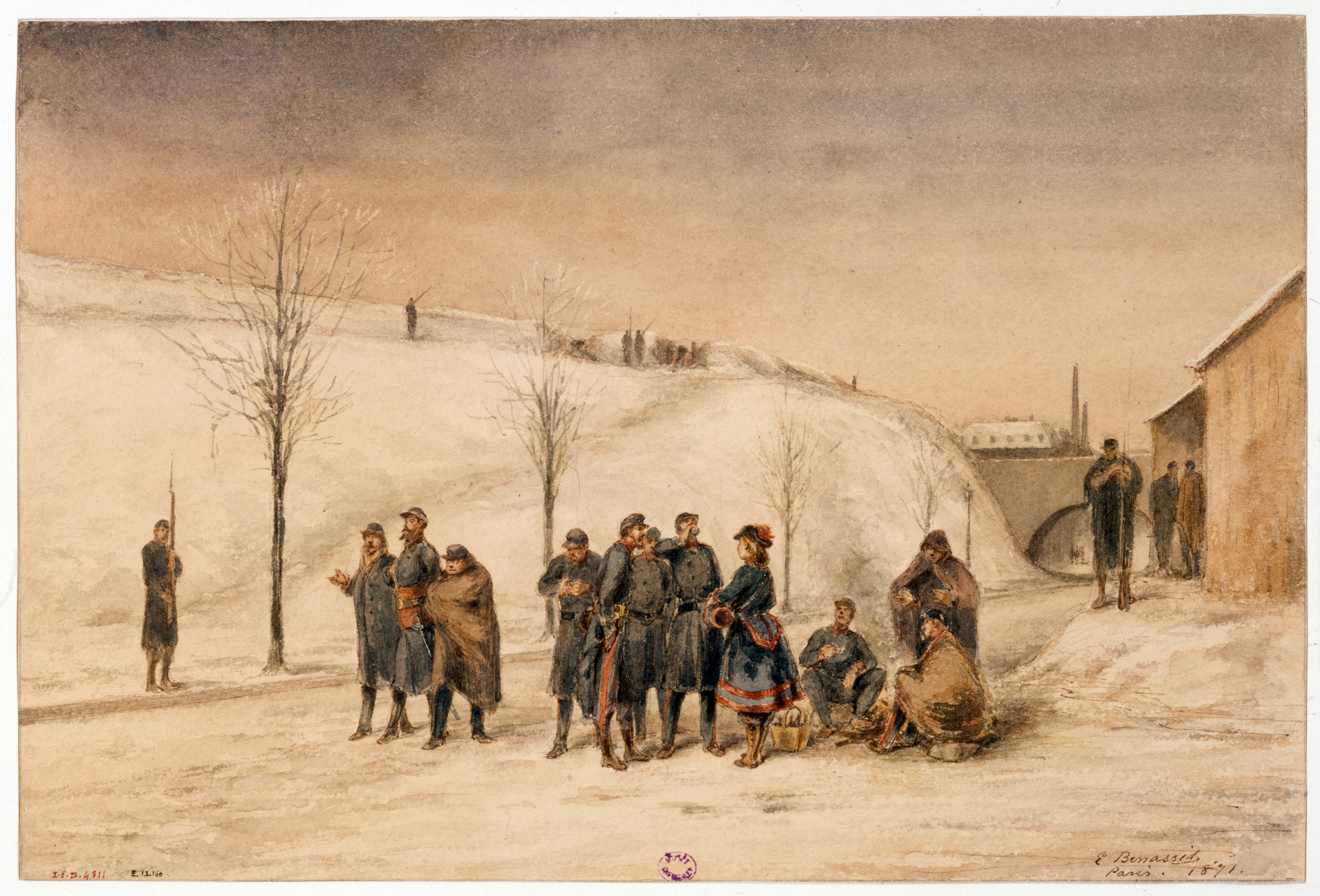
Soldats et cantinière aux fortifications, 1871, Musée Carnavalet

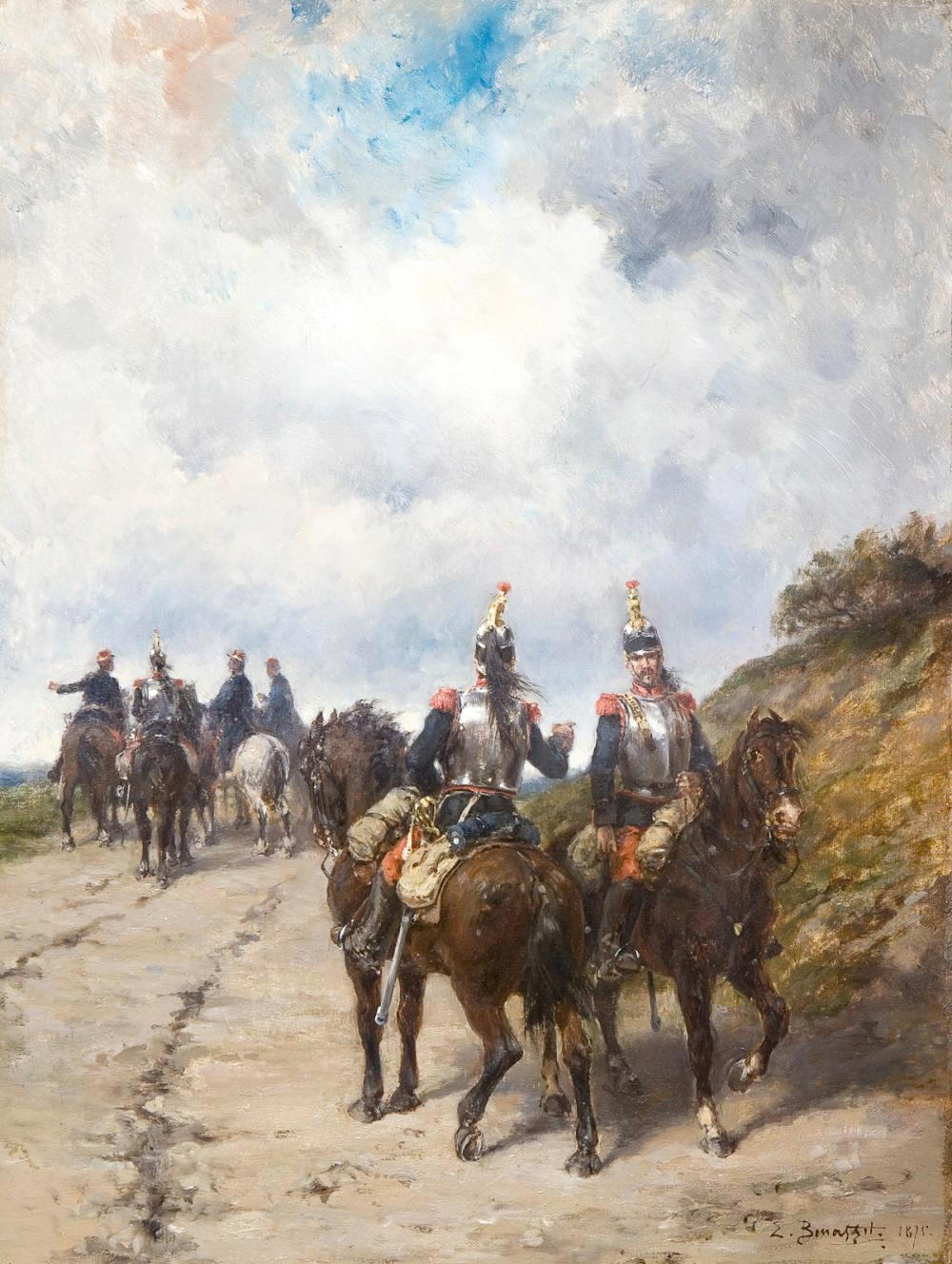
French cavalrymen, 1875, private collection

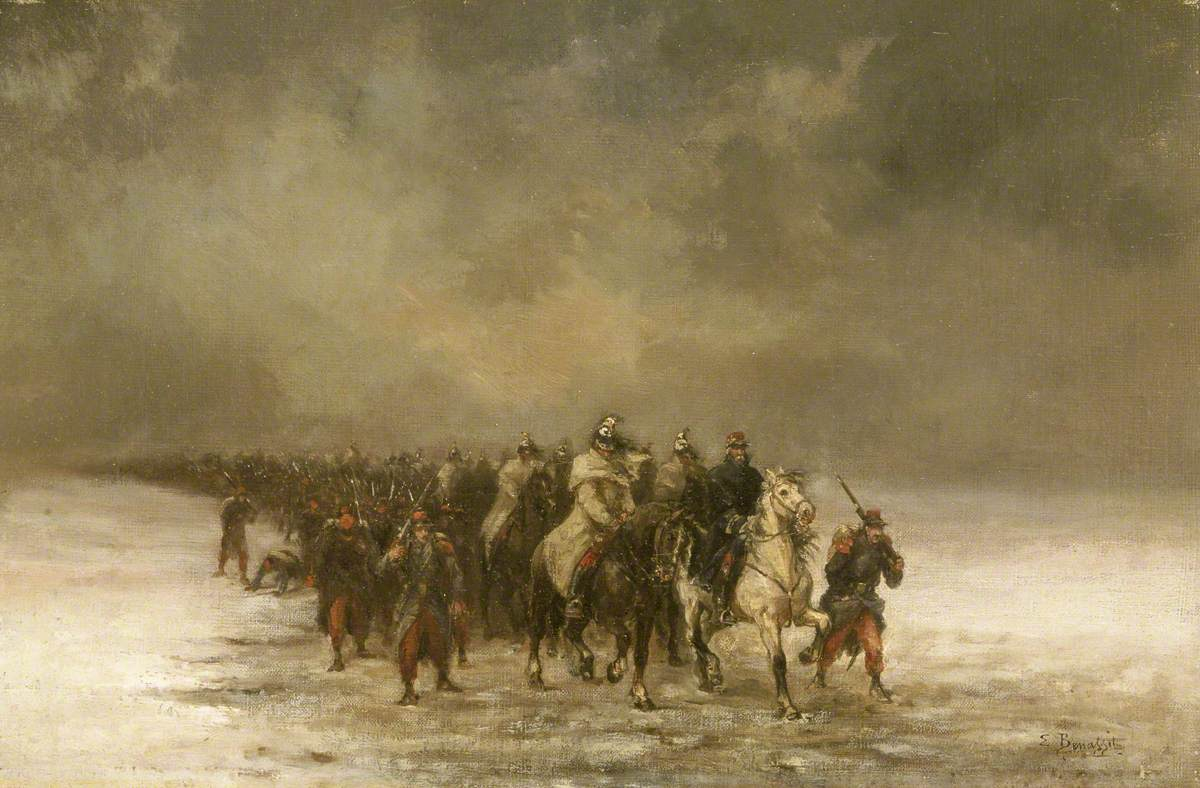
The Retreat, 1875, National Museum of Wales

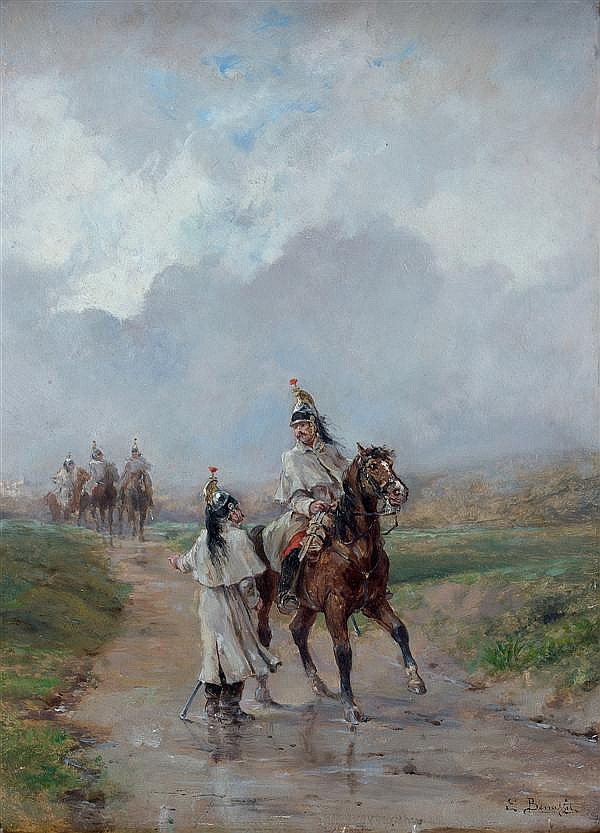
Dragoons on horseback, n.d., private collection

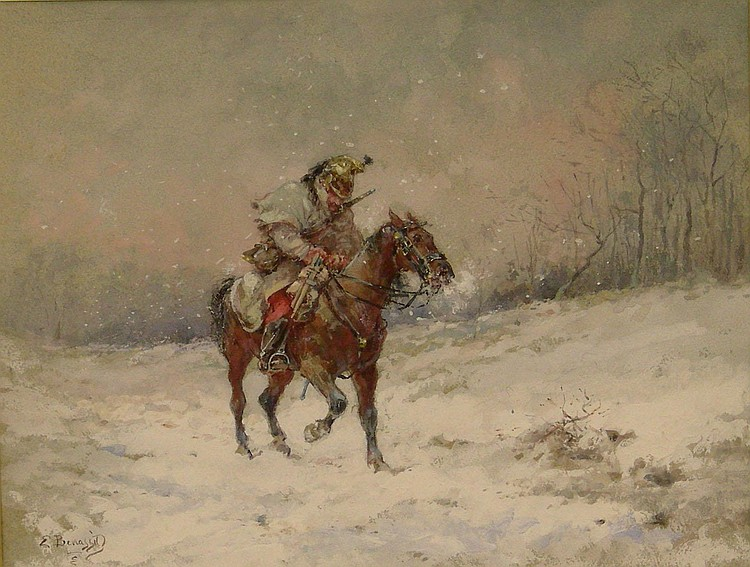
Prussian Cavalryman in the Snow, n.d., private collection

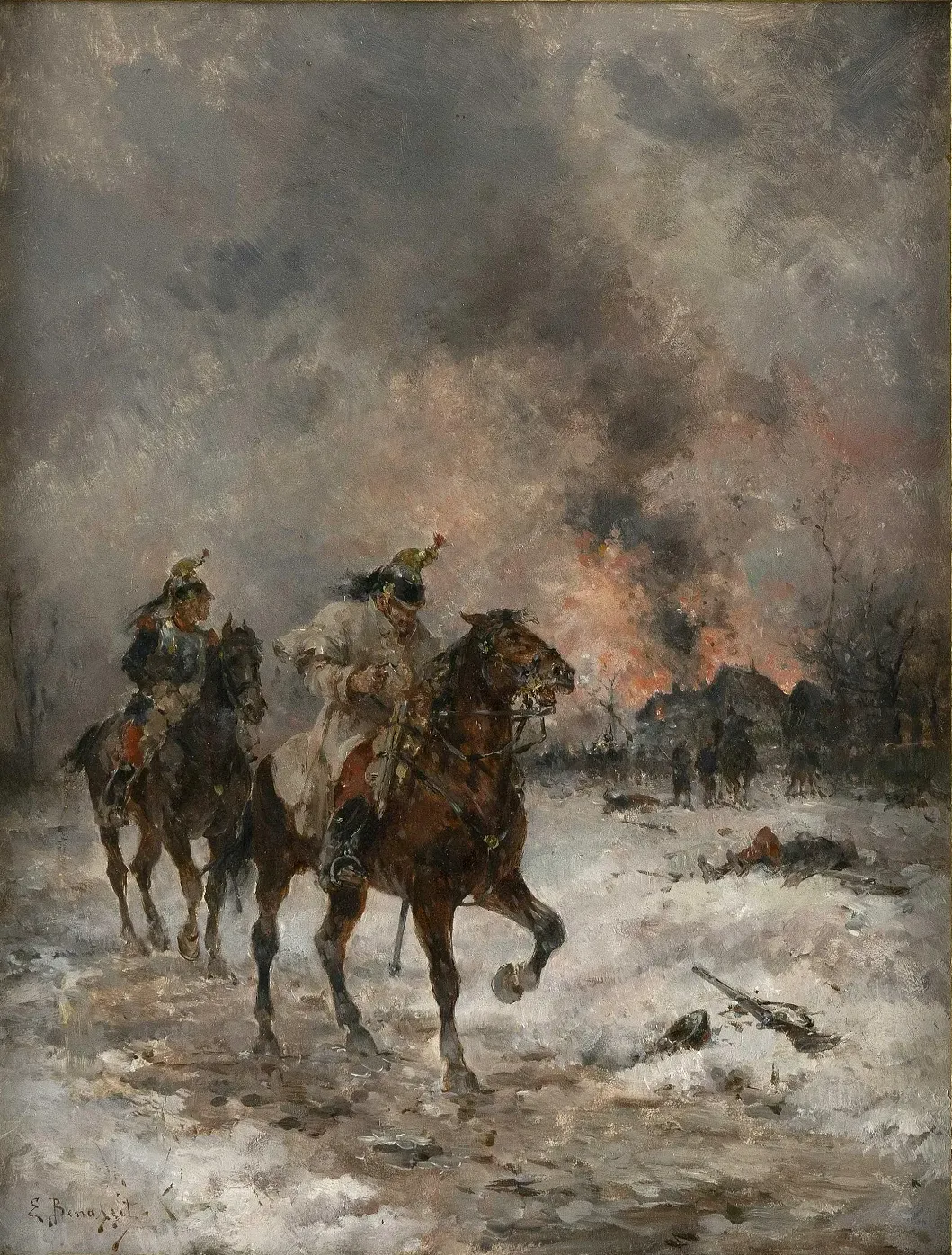
Burning Village, n.d., private collection

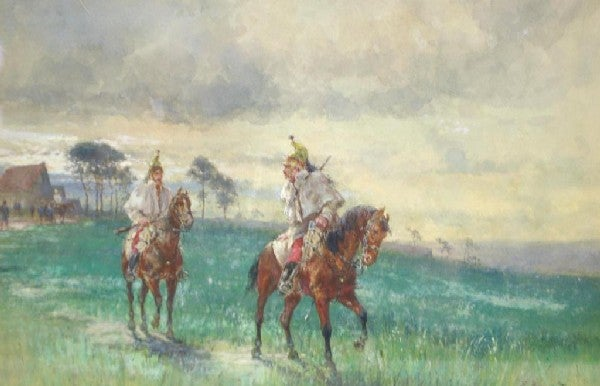
Un Reconnaissance, n.d., watercolor and goauche, private collection

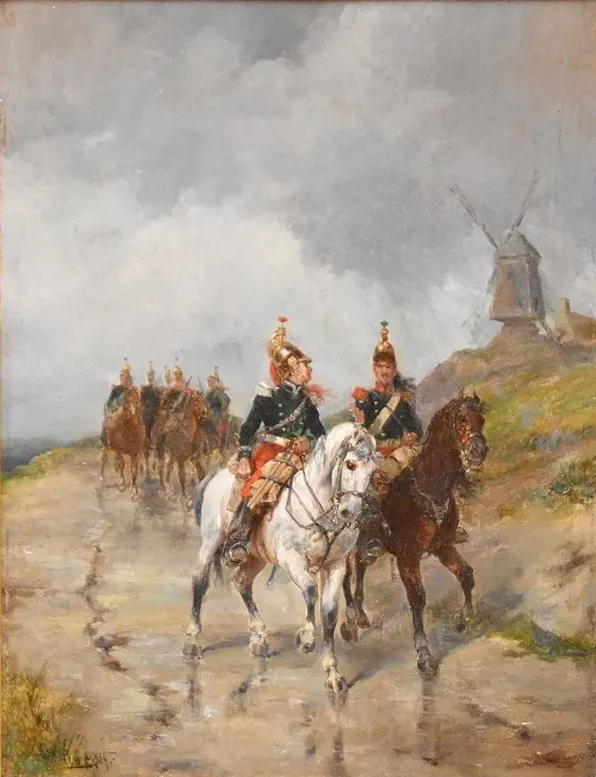
Soldiers and windmill, n.d., oil on panel, private collection

== Success, then onset of paralysis in the 1880s ==
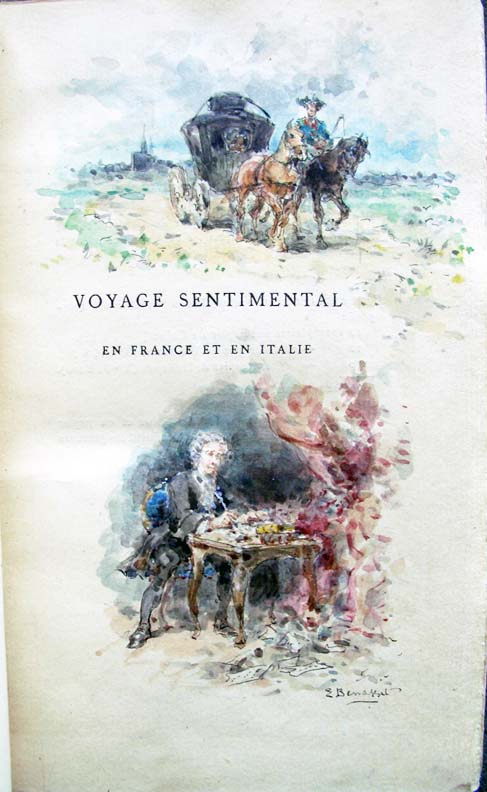
Watercolors for the half-title page of Laurence Sterne's Voyage Sentimental, Graphic Arts Collection, Princeton University Library.

After the war, Benassit resumed his work as an illustrator. An 1875 edition of Laurence Sterne's Voyage Sentimental published by Librairie des Bibliophiles and acquired in 2011 by Princeton University is extra-illustrated with watercolors by Benassit especially commissioned for the volume. He also illustrated Eugène Chavette's Les Petites comédies du vice and Anatole France's first novel, Le Crime de Sylvestre Bonnard.

Benassit also began to be taken more seriously as a painter. In February 1880, he had a one-man exhibition and sale of 32 paintings and five watercolors at the Hôtel Drouot. The catalogue included an appreciation by Charles Monselet that indicates the exhibition consisted largely or entirely of Benassit's charming, gently comical period pieces:

M. É. Benassit, in the vast kingdom of painting, has created a small world of Louis XVI and the Directory, where he is more or less master and lord. Here are the rides of gentlemen in red coats, stops in front of castle gates, returns from the hunt, village crossings. Luxury and good humor, such is his motto.…The collection that he delivers to the public today is like the summary of a period of natural elegance and coquetry that exists no longer, except in the realm of memories.

This period, and Benassit's particular approach to it, stuck a responsive chord with critics. A reviewer of the 1880 Paris Salon wrote that "M. Émile Benassit knows to his fingertips this era of voluptuous elegance called the eighteenth century."

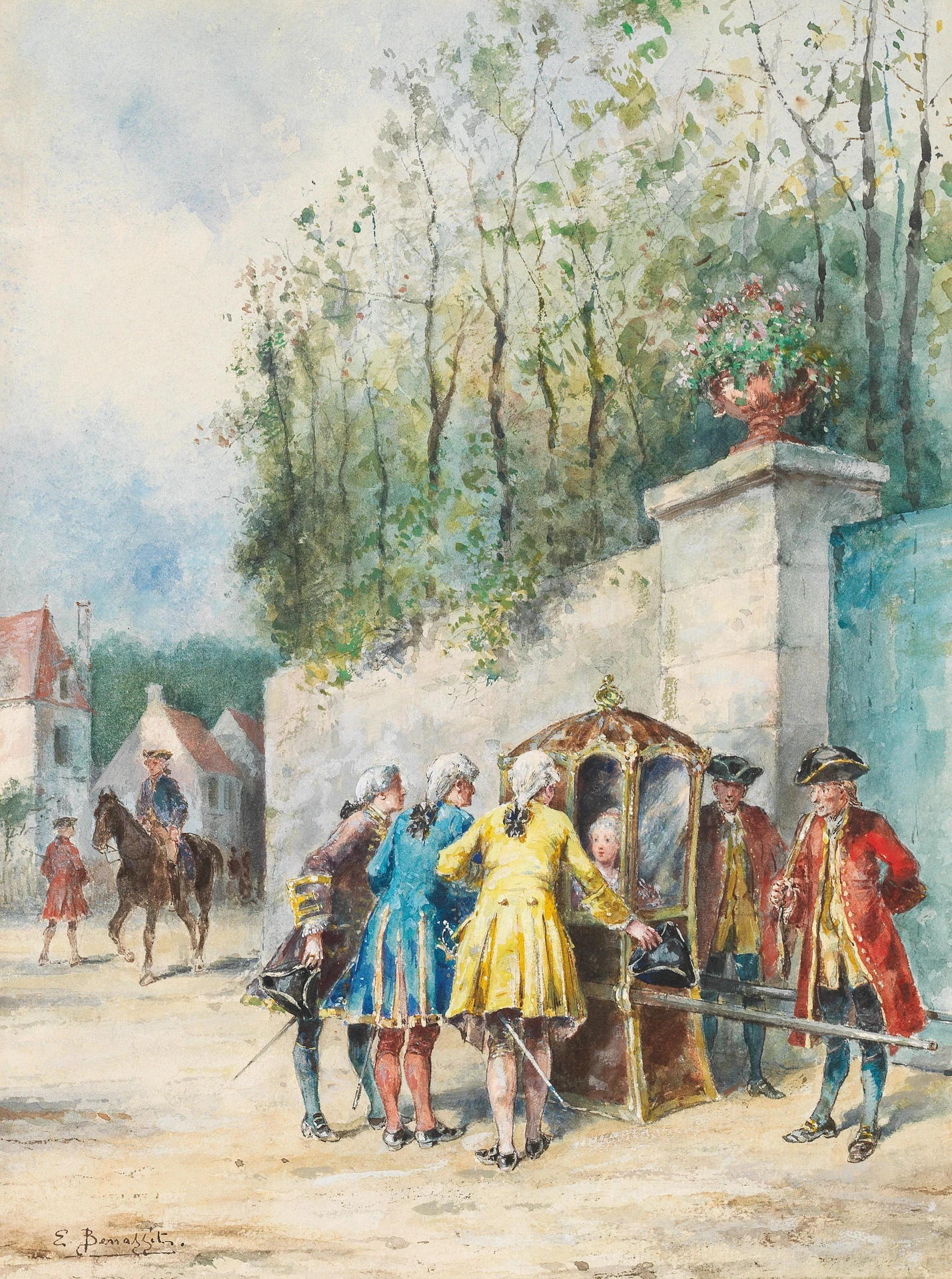
A young lady in a sedan chair and three gentlemen, n.d., watercolor on paper, private collection.

It was at about this time that the highly influential art dealer Paul Durand-Ruel took an interest in his work. In his mid-forties, Benassit's career was in the ascent.

But beginning in 1882, the right-handed Benassit experienced the onset of a progressive paralysis that started in his right arm—crippling the "expeditious hand" praised by Castagnary. Benassit "bravely took up the brush, his weapon of combat," and attempted to learn to paint with his left hand. In 1883, his illness was further complicated by a fall that broke a leg. By the beginning of 1884, he was walking with difficulty and barely able to use his left hand (to write, and not to draw). A visitor noted, "In his little apartment on the third floor of Rue Lepic, the days seem long and sad to him. However, some friends come to shake his hand and bring him their consolations. The most faithful are Monselet, Count H. O'Héguerty and our friend Paul Arène."

"The sad part," one observer noted, "is that the paralysis came to freeze his hand at the moment when Durand-Ruel had succeeded in making his paintings reach high prices—which were, in short, only reasonable prices."

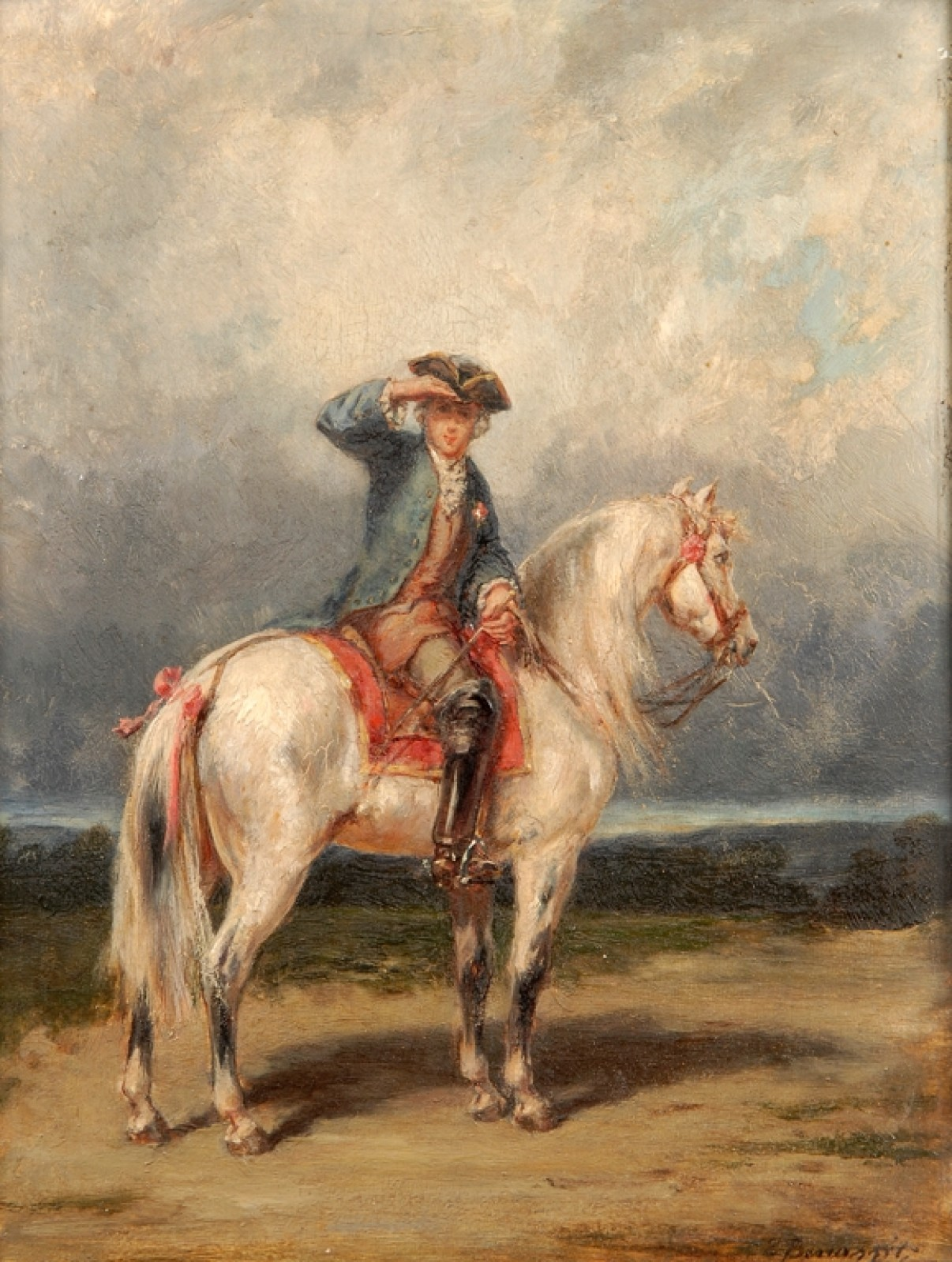
Le Cavalier, n.d., oil on panel, private collection.

In 1883 the newly-formed Société des Artistes Français came to Benassit's assistance with an indemnity of 500 francs. In 1884, two fundraisers were mounted on his behalf, a raffle in January of works by more than 80 artists including Léon Bonnat, John Lewis Brown, Karl Daubigny, and Jean-Jacques Henner, and a second raffle in May.

In his memoirs published in 1889, Charles Chincholle says that Benassit successfully learned to paint left-handed:

This charming artist who, at a time when he was finally about to draw glory and profit from his talent, had the terrible misfortune of being paralyzed in his right hand, this ruined man of art knew how to draw enough from himself, by sheer will-power, to play with the paralysis itself. His entire right side was almost extinct. What does it matter! He had the left side, the best one, that of the heart.…Bravely, he went to school again, on his own. He first learned to write, then to draw, finally to paint with the left hand. It was five years ago, and today he has the supreme happiness to note that what he did with the right hand never was worth what he does with the left. This can be explained. The greater effort naturally brought the better result.

A generation after Benassit's death, a newspaper would publish this anecdote:

Struck with partial paralysis on his right side, he patiently practiced painting with his left hand. The disease, however, was increasing day by day. He believed for a while that he would no longer be able to speak, no longer be able to utter his biting words. But he did not lose his humor for an instant. When a visitor found him one day receiving a pedicure, he explained: "When I can no longer move my hands or speak, I will write with my feet. So I'm doing my nails!"

== Death and legacy ==
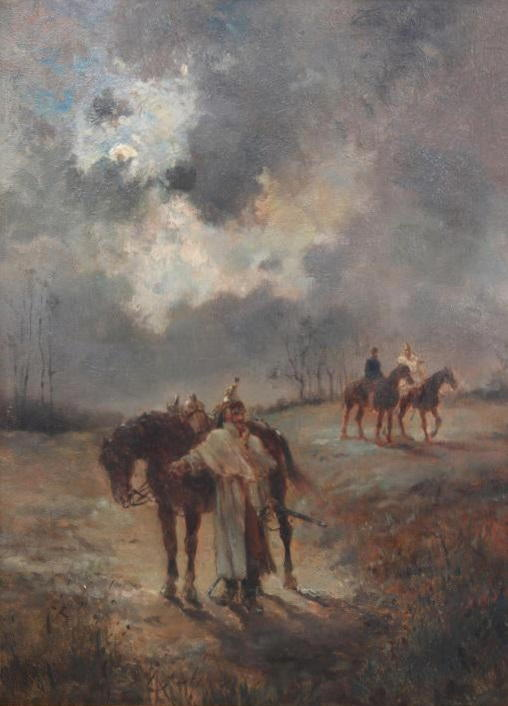
En Vedette, n.d., private collection. One of two works by Benassit loaned by Paul Durand-Ruel for exhibition in the Lewis and Clark Centennial Exposition in Portland, Oregon, 1905.

Benassit spent the last twelve years of his life away from Paris, living with his brother Ernest at Jouarre, where he died 9 August 1902. Chincolle in his memoirs mentions that Benassit had a wife, who was also ill in the 1880s, but no wife or children are mentioned as survivors in Benassit's obituaries.

Before his paralysis, he had created (and apparently had sold or given away) more than 400 paintings. After his paralysis, a subsequent sharp rise in the value of these works increased his prestige and profited the owners, but was of no commercial benefit to Benassit.

Jules Noriac claimed that Benassit's pranks and jokes detracted from his work as an artist: "Citizen Bénassit is a painter who would have infinite talent if he did not have so much wit. I would say it to his face."

Fernand Xau wrote in 1884, "Benassit has always preferred the society of men of letters to that of painters. Perhaps that is why he finds so much sympathy in the press and so much antipathy among the little-known daubers." But the press was not always his friend. One obituary, by the columnist Scaramouche in L'Aurore, delivered this unsparing assessment: "The painter Bénassit, who has died very much forgotten, acquired, in literary circles before 1870, a great reputation for his acerbic wit…Basically, Bénassit's character was the result of great timidity and a lack of self-confidence, which prevented him both from asserting his talent as a painter and from daring to become a man of letters. He would have succeeded in one genre or the other, if he had not let himself be reduced to the role of joker by the camaros who did not perceive what his fanciful mind was hiding in bitterness and regret."

Nonetheless, Benassit's reputation as a painter continued to crest after the turn of the century, thanks in part to the efforts of the art dealer Paul Durand-Ruel (legendary promoter of Impressionism), who displayed and sold Benassit's work alongside those of Manet, Monet, and Pissarro at his galleries in Paris and New York.

Benassit's wide reputation as a raconteur and wit in café society, his connections to both the artistic and the literary circles of the day, his considerable success as an artist, and the pathos of his affliction gave him a high profile in the Parisian press for three decades and led to many appearances, from passing mentions to long anecdotes, in memoirs of the era—a trove of information that has yet to be mined by modern scholars, art historians, and biographers.

== Sources ==
- Arène, Paul (1885). "A Propos du Salon", Gil Blas, 3 May 1885, pp. 1–2.
- Beraldi, Henri (1885). Les graveurs du 19e siècle; guide de l'amateur d'estampes modernes, vol II, Paris: Paris L. Conquet, 1885, pp. 31-32.
- Bernard, Daniel (1880). "Salon de 1880", L'Univers illustré, 3 July 1880, p. 422-423.
- Calmettes, Fernand (1902). Un demi siècle littéraire: Lecomte de Lisle et ses amis, Paris: Librairies-imprimeries réunies, 1902, pp. 129, 130, 138-139.
- Carjat, Étienne (1883). "Emile Benassit" in Artiste et citoyen: poésies; précédées d'une lettre de Victor Hugo, Paris: Tresse Éditeur, 1883, pp. 145–147.
- Castagnary, Jules-Antoine (1866). "Varia: Les heures pariesienne", La Libeté, 29 Nov. 1866, p. 3.
- Chincholle, Charles (1889). "Chapter XXIV: Émile Bénassit" in Les mémoires de Paris; preface par Émile Zola, Paris: Librairie modern, 1889, pp. 241–246.
- Daudet, Alphonse (1896). Thirty Years of Paris and of My Literary Life, London: J. M. Dent and Co, 1896, p. 157.
- Dargenty, G. (1884). "Exposition Benassit, Courrier de l’Art, 10 January 1884, p. 16.
- Delalain, Édouard Léon and de Targes, Georges (1871). Tablettes d'un mobile: journal historique et anecdotique du siége de Paris, du 18 septembre 1870 au 28 janvier 1871, Paris: Bureaux de la Bibliothèque Générale, 1871.p. 218.
- Dauphin, Léopold (1879). I miei fantoccj: Monsieur Polichinelle en voyage: ballet enfantin pour théâtre de marionnettes, music score, with a sonnet by Paul Aréne and 12 illustrations by Émile Benassit, Paris: E. et A. Girod, 1879.
- Duval, Georges (1913). Memoires d'un Parisien: première période, Paris: Ernest Flammarion, c. 1913, pp. 161-162.
- Grand Jacques, Le (1869). Manuel du vélocipède, illustrated by Émile Benassit, Paris: Librairie du Petit Journal, 1869.
- Fallaize, Elizabeth (1987). Etienne Carjat and "Le Boulevard" (1861-1863), Genève-Paris: Editions Slatkine, 1987, pp. 62, 84-86, 102, 104-105, 266.
- Lemer, Julien (1872). Appendice aux "Heures parisiennes": histoire du livre d'Alfred Delvau intitulé "Heures parisiennes", Paris: Librairie Centrale, 1872.
- Lemercier de Neuville, Louis (1911). Souvenir d'un montreur de Marionnettes, Paris: Maurice Bauche, 1911, pp. 131–137.
- Monselet, Charles (1879). Le petit Paris: tableaux et figures de ce temps, Paris: Le Librairie de E. Dentu, 1879.
- Monselet, Charles (1880). Introduction, Vente de tableaux et aquarelles par Émile Bénassit, Paris: Hôtel Drouot, date of sale: 25 February 1880.
- Noriac, Jules (1873). "Courrier de Paris", Le Monde illustré, 19 July 1873, p. 34-35.
- Parisis (1884). "La Vie Parisienne" in Le Figaro, 17 April 1884, pp. 1–2.
- Rude, Maxime (1877). Tout-Paris au café, Paris: Maurice Dreyfous, Éditeur, 1877, pp. 269-270.
- Scaramouche (1902). "Echos et Nouvelles," L'Aurore, August 14, 1902, p. 1.
- Sergines (1902). "Les Echos de Paris," Les Annales politiques et littéraires (Paris), 17 August 1902, p 101-102.
- Treich, Léon (1927). "Un ami d'Alphonse Daudet: Émile Benassit", Comoedia, 29 January 1927, pp. 1–2.
- Xau, Fernand (1884). "Émile Benassit", Gil Blas, 11 January 1884, p. 2.
