= Anthony Morris Storer =

British politician and diplomat

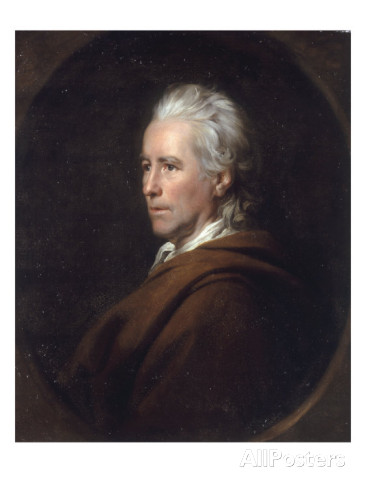
Anthony Morris Storer by Nathaniel Dance-Holland

Anthony Morris Storer (1746–1799) was an English man of fashion, politician and collector.

== Life ==
Born on 12 March 1746, Anthony Morris Storer was elder son of Thomas Storer of Westmoreland, Jamaica (d. Golden Square, London, on 21 July 1793, aged 76), who married Helen, daughter of Colonel Guthrie. He was at Eton College from about 1760 to 1764 with Charles James Fox and Earl Fitzwilliam. He was admitted a fellow-commoner of Corpus Christi College, Cambridge in December 1764, but left without taking a degree.

Storer became a prominent figure of London's social world. Through patronage, he was both a man of fashion, and a Whig politician. During 1778 and 1779 he was in America with Frederick Howard, 5th Earl of Carlisle and William Eden. He visited Carlisle in Ireland in 1781, and, through his interest, succeeded Benjamin L'Anglois as a commissioner of the Board of Trade on 26 July 1781. Meanwhile, he sat in the House of Commons as Member for Carlisle from 1774 to 1780, and subsequently—from 1780 to 1784—for Morpeth.

Much of Storer's time was passed with the family of Lord North, and in August 1782 he was a channel of communication between North and Fox. He enlisted in the Fox–North Coalition; and in September 1783, to the indignation of Edward Gibbon, who also aspired to the post, he was sent by Fox to Paris as secretary of the legation. On 13 December 1783, when the ambassador, the Duke of Manchester, came home, Storer was nominated as minister plenipotentiary. Six days later his friends were ejected from office. Storer's connection with politics then ceased. He had by that time quarrelled with Carlisle, and so did not seek re-election for Carlisle's borough of Morpeth after the dissolution of 1784.

In 1786 he was reading the Latin and Greek writers with Edward Harwood, who used Storer's library. He was desirous in December 1787 of entering the diplomatic service, and in April 1793 he languished for employment; but his father's death in the same year brought him a fortune. He purchased Purley Park, between Pangbourne and Reading and, with the advice of Humphrey Repton, improved and ornamented the grounds. His health was bad, however; he had been very ill in the winter of 1787–8, and he did not live to complete the house for the estate. But the mansion was erected after his death from the designs of Wyatt. Repton left a rather unflattering description of his dealings with Storer in his personal journal published in Project Purley Vol 45 September 1997

== Collection and Extra-illustration ==
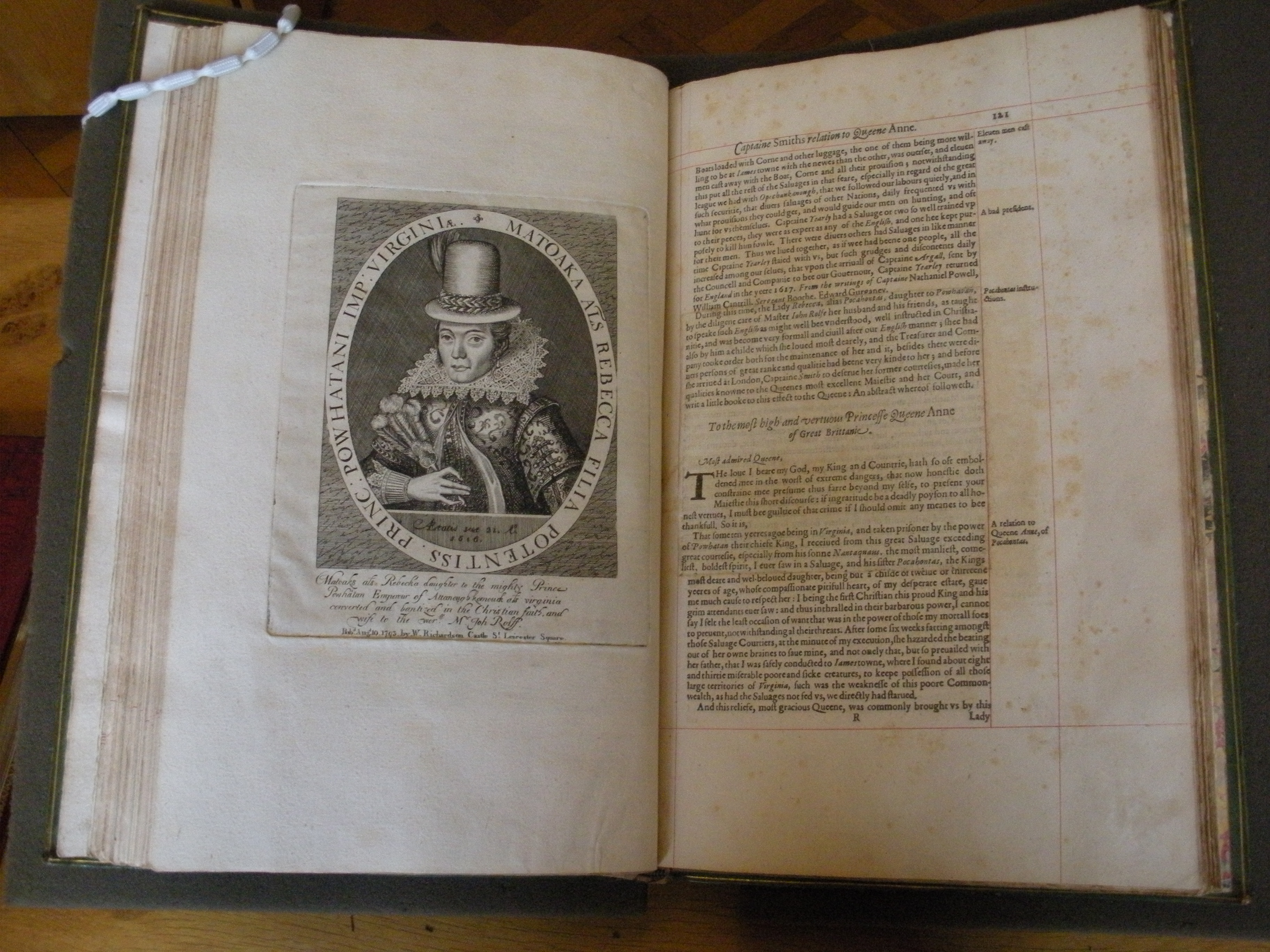
John Smith, The generall historie of Virginia, New-England, and the Summer Isles (London, 1624), extra-illustrated in one folio volume by Anthony Morris Storer. The book was first owned by James I and was bought by Storer in 'a dirty bookseller in Derby'. Eton College Library, Ci.1.2.01.

According to Horace Walpole, Storer began collecting books and prints in 1781, acerbically adding that Storer, as a man of fashion, was "a macaroni turned antiquary." Although Storer complained of the "burden of having nothing to do" in 1787, having been three years out of Parliament, he was busy developing his library and print collection. In addition to early bindings, Storer collected Caxtons and other black-letter books, Greek and Latin classics, Italian literature and early English plays including the first three folios of Shakespeare. His interest in topography and extra-illustration is shown by a letter from Thomas Pennant who wrote to Storer in 1782 saying that he wished "to contribute to his [Storer's] amusements in his private hours."

Storer left his complete library to Eton College in 1799. His collection of prints and extra-illustrated books also went to Eton, the extra-illustrated works being stored in a specially designed press brought from his Devonshire Street residence and installed in the College library to house the bequest. Despite the riches of Storer's library – 87 books extra-illustrated by Storer in 143 volumes – the only title named in his will is James Granger's Biographical History of England.

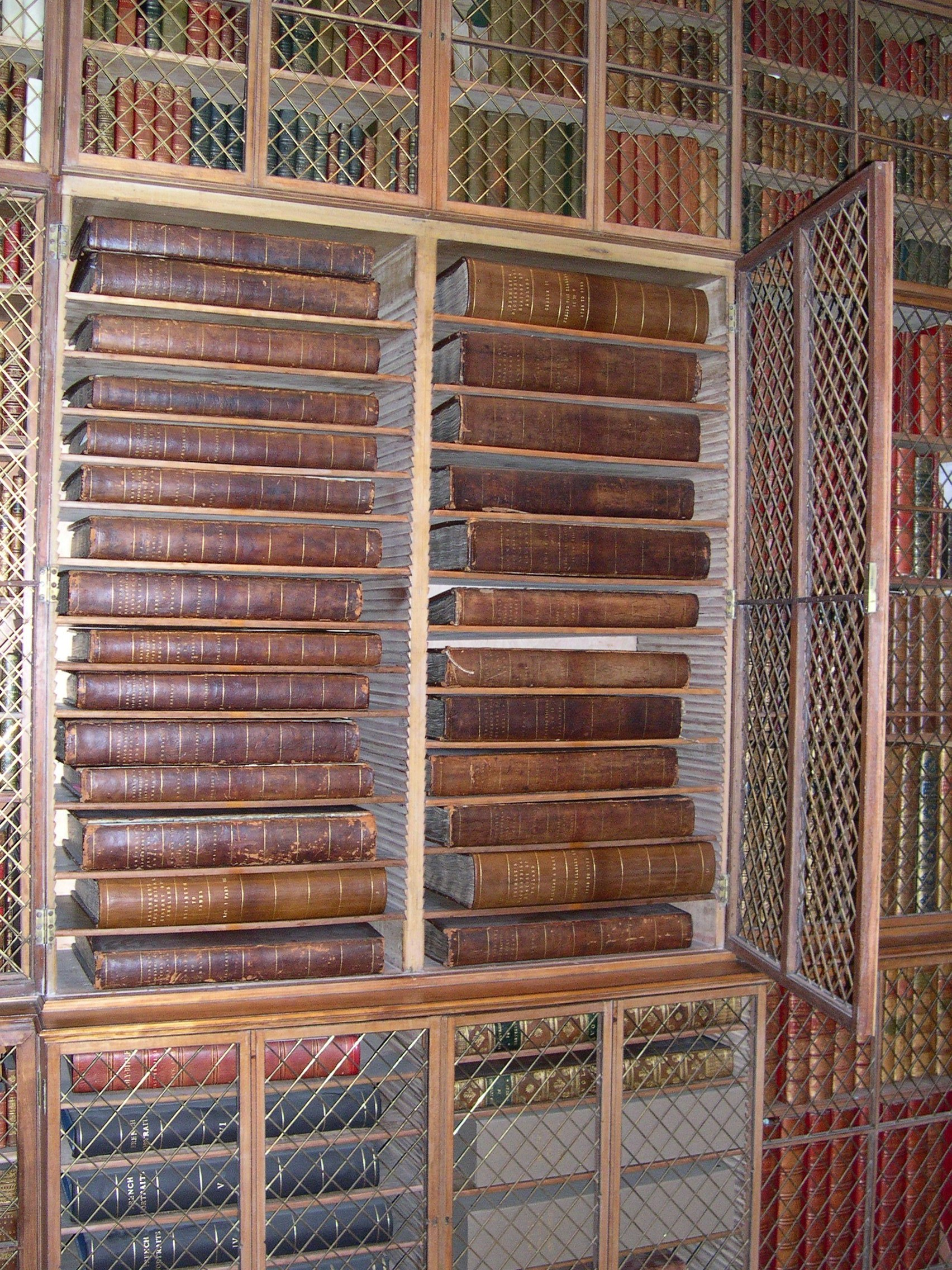
Eton College Library showing Anthony Morris Storer's extra-illustrated copy of James Granger's Biographical History of England, left to the College in 1799 along with the book press.

== Death and legacy ==
Storer died at Bristol Hotwells on 28 June 1799, and was buried at Purley, a monument by Nollekens, with a Latin inscription, being erected to his memory in Purley church. Storer was elected Fellow of the Society of Antiquaries of London on 11 December 1777, and became a member of the Dilettanti Society on 18 April 1790.

Storer's fortune was left to his nephew, Anthony Gilbert Storer, the only son of his brother Thomas James Storer, who had married the Hon. Elizabeth Proby, daughter of John Proby, 1st Baron Carysfort. The only other legacy was the sum of £1,000 to James Hare.

Letters by Storer are printed in John Heneage Jesse's George Selwyn and his Contemporaries, vols. iii. and iv., and in the Correspondence of William Eden, Lord Auckland.

== Notes ==
Attribution

This article incorporates text from a publication now in the public domain: Lee, Sidney, ed. (1898). "Storer, Anthony Morris". Dictionary of National Biography. Vol. 54. London: Smith, Elder & Co.
