= La France bouge =

French royalist song

La France bouge, lit. 'France is moving', is a french royalist protest song written by Charles Maurras and Maurice Pujo in 1909.

== History ==
The song is inspired by the marching song Le Midi bouge, composed in 1870 by Paul Arène, whose melody itself was taken from La Chanson des Filles d’Avignon, a regional popular song. According to Maurras, “the furious tone of the song” is explained by “circumstances marked by an appearance of imperious violence,” which he attributed to “the Jews and their republican accomplices”
