= Charles Monselet =

French journalist, novelist, poet and playwright (1825–1888)

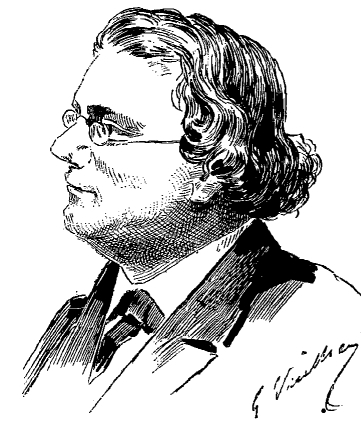
- Born: 30 April 1825; Nantes, France
- Died: 19 May 1888 (aged 63); Paris, France

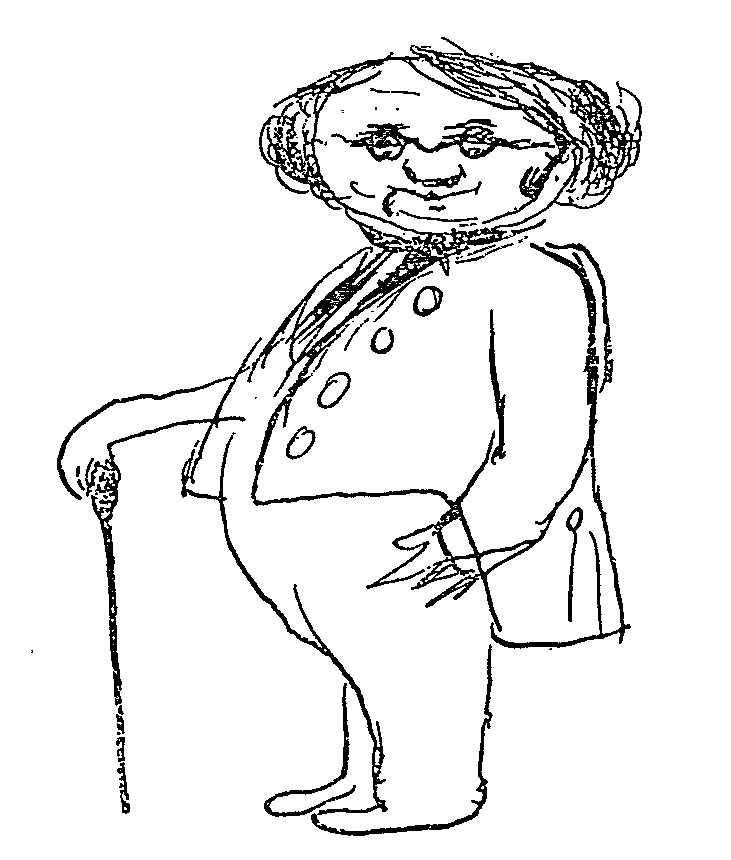
Self-portrait in La Plume en 1891.

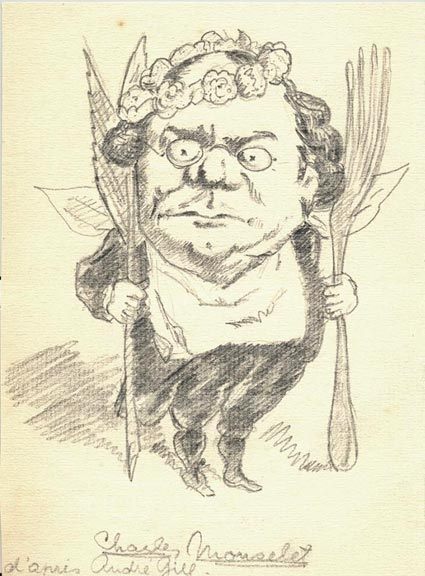
Charles Monselet as a gastronome, after André Gill.

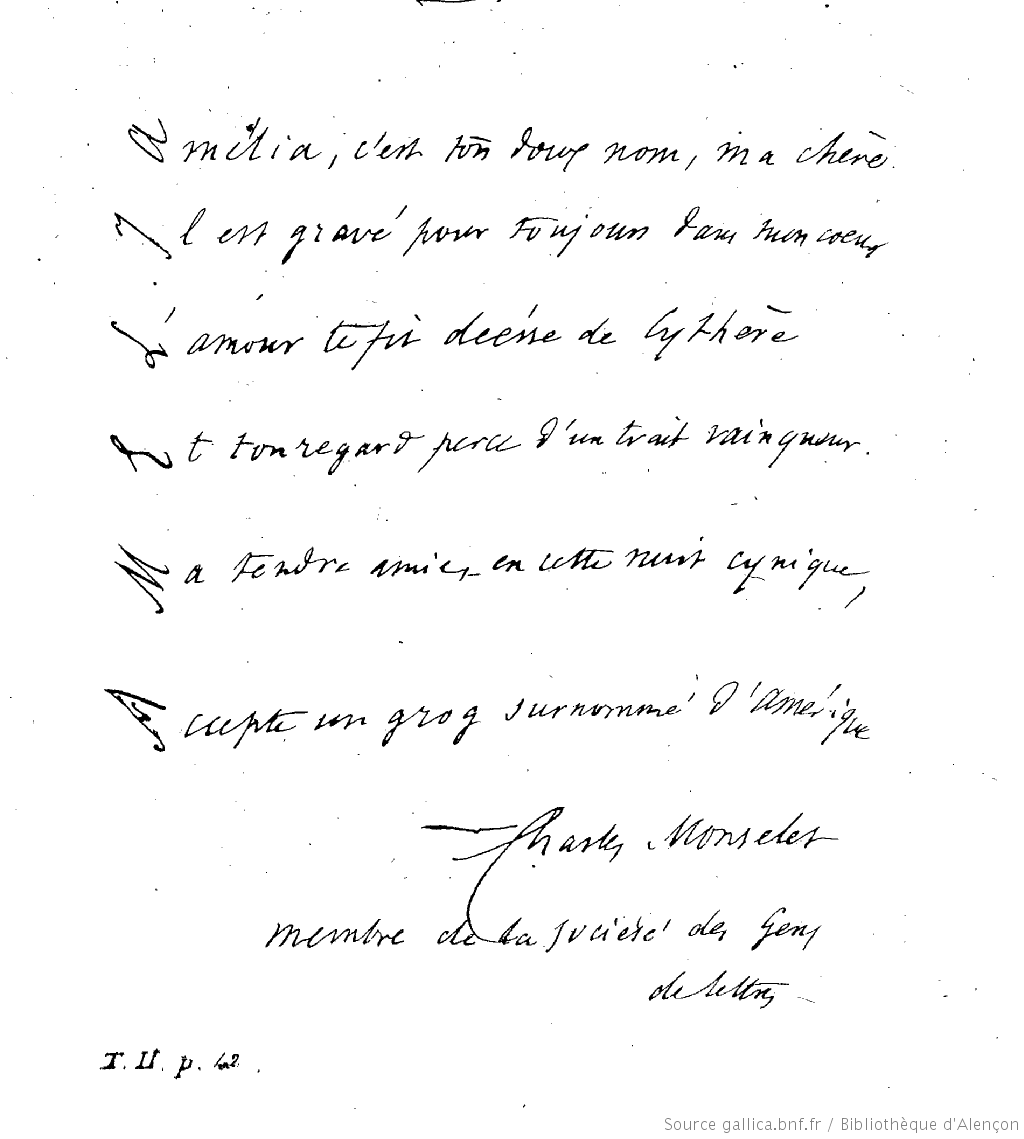
Manuscript of his poem Amelia.

Charles Monselet (French: [ʃaʁl mɔ̃səlɛ]; 30 April 1825, Nantes – 19 May 1888, Paris) was a French writer and gourmand.

== Biography ==
Monselet was born at No. 16 rue Jean-Jacques-Rousseau in Nantes, on the facade of which building a plaque now memorializes him. As the son of a bookseller, Monselet handled books before writing them, and in his childhood developed a taste for books and a love of letters. He passed the first nine years of his life in his city of birth, before his parents moved to Bordeaux. After growing up in Bordeaux, he returned to his hometown in 1852, and, like his father, made his first forays into the literary profession, after an apprenticeship, first as a typesetter, then as a proofreader, at the Courrier de la Gironde. He rose from faits divers to the entrefilet, then to full articles in the smaller journals, upon which Félix Solar summoned him to Paris where he had founded L'Époque (1865), and where he lived in close contact with the bohemian writers Baudelaire, Théophile Gautier, Albert Glatigny, Alfred Delvau, Charles Bataille, Amédée Rolland, and others. In Paris, Monselet was also one of the most frequent guests at the home of Victor Hugo, who often would say to him: "When I write to you, as M. Monselet, quai Voltaire, I'm always tempted to put on the envelope: to M. de Voltaire, quai Monselet."

L'Époque having failed, he went on to work at la Presse, where he made successful entry into all genres: literary history, bibliography, theater, poetry, novels, short stories, theater feuilletons, articles of criticism. He refused no work. He provided series of chronicles and feuilletons to Le Pays, l'Assemblée nationale, l’Athenœum and la Presse, very careful studies inserted in the Revue de Paris, the Bibliothèque galante du XVIII^{e} siècle, articles in Le Constitutionnel, Le Monde Illustré, then at Le Figaro.

Monselet disseminated the spirit of the 18th century, in fantasies published at the biweekly Figaro, at l’Événement, then at the daily Figaro, where he led his longest and most noted campaigns, and to which he contributed until two or three years before his death.

A literary connoisseur and passionate bibliophile, fed on the authors of the 18th century, he spread awareness among literary society, from the beginning at l’Artiste, and later at the Revue de Paris, of the lesser-known groups of the time. First, he evoked and spotlighted its stranger characters in les Oubliés et les Dédaignés, a picturesque rehabilitation of neglected authors of the 18th century, pointing out by comparison the stylistic eclecticism of the literary schools of the middle of the Second Empire. He was historiographer of Élie Fréron and Restif de la Bretonne, of the abbés galants of the Regency period, and of the original or eccentric figures who attained a moment of celebrity on the eve of the French Revolution.

His bibliography includes around forty volumes, literary snapshots, playful short stories full of color and delight, detective and romance novels, where women often play central roles, as most notably in la Franc-Maçonnerie des femmes (1856).

As a poet, he exercised a subtly sensual tone with frank verses full of a heady verve skillfully restrained, in his collection le Plaisir et l’Amour ("Pleasure and Love"), addressing contemporary subjects with a great skillfulness of craftsmanship, with the refined and gallant art of the 18th century. His poem Les Petites Blanchisseuses ("The Little Laundresses") enjoyed a great notoriety in the 19th century. The Parisian journalists, who often evoked this libertine poem in their articles talking about the feast of Mi-Carême, a feature of which is the celebration of laundresses, only ever cite the first quatrain, which is very proper and gives no glimpse of what is to follow.

He was one of the authors of the pastiche Le Parnassiculet contemporain, and was friends with Capot de Feuillide, for whom he wrote a favorable critique in La Lorgnette littéraire: dictionnaire des grands et des petits auteurs de mon temps. A detailed portrait of Charles Baudelaire is presented, among others, in this collection of portraits.

For the theater, he had written a verse comedy intended for the Comédie-Française, le Valet de Tartuffe, but Monselet was more the heir of Chamfort than of Molière. He presented a parody, a revue, a show played at Bade, three acts of comedy in collaboration with Lemonnier, and l'Ilote, a verse comedy written in collaboration with Paul Arène, which was staged at the Théâtre-Français. He wrote theatrical criticism at Le Monde illustré, but rarely set foot in a theater hall. When he was asked why, theater critic as he was, no one ever saw him at the theater: "It's because," he responded, "I'd be afraid of letting myself be influenced!" He even cherished the idea of founding a theater where he himself would be the director: le théâtre de la Porte-Montmartre, in the spirit of the comédie italienne of the previous century. This project was never undertaken, since it did not receive the thousand francs it asked from the public.

Monselet loved to resuscitate old dining traditions, and in an attempt to revive awareness of those of Grimod de la Reynière and Brillat-Savarin, he published l’Almanach gourmand (1865), La Cuisine poétique in 1858 founded a weekly review dedicated to gastronomy, Le Gourmet, which was printed from February to August, and then foundered.

Monselet was nevertheless more greedy than hedonistic, more glutton than connoisseur. Eugène Chavette, wanting to prove that Monselet was not a gourmet, invited him one day in the company of Aurélien Scholl to the restaurant Brébant, and made him serve a meal where the dishes did not correspond to the printed menu: The swallows' nests were in fact simple noodles with mashed flageolet beans, cod bream cooked on a comb, heather cock, a small turkey with absinthe, Château-Larose, Mâcon with a few drops of Grassot punch, etc. Monselet found the dishes and wines to be exquisite. In response to Chavette's triumph, Monselet said to his friends, in a gentle and resigned tone: "I have children… don't ruin me!"

Despite his prominent belly, he engaged in a pistol duel with Émile Augier and a sword duel with Théodore Barrière, but to a matrimonial agent who insisted on a duel, he responded simply: "Stop bothering me! I don't want to get married!" The death of his friend Baron Brisse, just before a dinner, earned him this joke - probably apocryphal: "Let's go to the table all the same!"

Struck with a heart condition about two months before his death, he was cared for by Gérard Piogey during the whole course of his illness. He left behind four children: two sons, André, a journalist who would publish a biography of his father, and Étienne, a painter; two daughters, Clotilde, who went by the stage name "de Monsay," and Louise, who like her husband, Adolphe Candé, was an artist at the Saint-Petersburg Theater.

== Prose (incomplete) ==
- Les Chemises rouges, 5 vol., 1850-1857) — read online on Gallica
- M. Le Duc s'amuse,
- François Soleil, lire en ligne [archive] sur Gallica;
- La Fin de l'orgie, lire en ligne [archive] sur Gallica (1866).
- Statues et statuettes contemporaines, 1852.
- Histoire anecdotique du tribunal révolutionnaire (17 août-29 novembre 1792), 1853, lire en ligne [archive] sur Gallica.
- Rétif de la Bretonne. Sa vie et ses amours : documents inédits; ses descendants; catalogue complet de ses ouvrages, 1854, read online on Gallica.
- Les Aveux d'un pamphlétaire, 1854.
- Figurines parisiennes, 1854, lire en ligne [archive] sur Gallica.
- Les Vignes du Seigneur, 1854.
- La Franc-Maçonnerie des femmes, 1856, 4 vol. — réédité aux éditions du Masque, coll. « Labyrinthes », no 190, 2011.
- Physionomies parisiennes. Acteurs et actrices, 1857.
- La Lorgnette littéraire. Dictionnaire de grands et des petits auteurs de mon temps, 1857, lire en ligne [archive] sur Gallica.
- Les Oubliés et les Dédaignés, 1857, lire en ligne [archive] sur Gallica.
- Les Ruines de Paris, 1857, vol., 1 [archive] sur Gallica; 2 [archive] sur Gallica 3 [archive] sur Gallica 4 [archive] sur Gallica — réédité sous le titre L'Argent maudit, 1875.
- Monsieur de Cupidon, 1858, lire en ligne [archive] sur Gallica.
- La Cuisinière poétique, avec d'autres auteurs (1859)
- Les Tréteaux, 1859, lire en ligne [archive] sur Gallica.
- Théâtre du Figaro, 1861, lire en ligne [archive] sur Gallica.
- Les Galanteries du xviiie siècle (réédité sous le titre Les Amours du temps passé, 1875), 1862, lire en ligne [archive] sur Gallica.
- Almanach des gourmands, 1862-1870, 6 vol.
- Fréron, ou l'Illustre critique, sa vie, ses écrits, sa correspondence, sa famille, etc., 1864.
- De Montmartre à Séville, 1865, lire en ligne [archive] sur Gallica — réédité sous le titre Les Souliers de Sterne. Récits et tableaux de voyage : France, Angleterre, Italie, * * * Belgique, Allemagne, Espagne, Portugal, 1874, lire en ligne [archive] sur Gallica.
- Le Plaisir et l'Amour, 1865, lire en ligne [archive] sur Gallica.
- Les femmes qui font des scènes, 1865, lire en ligne [archive] sur Gallica.
- Almanach des rues et des bois, citadin, champêtre et poétique, pour 1866, indispensable à tous les gens de bien, 1866.
- Portraits après décès, avec lettres inédites, 1866, lire en ligne [archive] sur Gallica — réédité sous le titre Les Ressuscités, 1876.
- Les Premières Représentations célèbres, 1867, lire en ligne [archive] sur Gallica.
- Les Créanciers, 1870.
- Le Musée secret de Paris, v. 1870, lire en ligne [archive] sur Gallica.
- Chanvallon, histoire d'un souffleur de la Comédie-française, 1872, lire en ligne [archive] sur Gallica.
- Les Frères Chantemesse, 1872, 2 vol., 1 [archive] sur Gallica.
- Les Marges du Code. La Belle Olympe, 1873, lire en ligne [archive] sur Gallica.
- Les Mystères du Boulevard des Invalides, 1873, lire en ligne [archive] sur Gallica.
- Panier fleuri, prose et vers, 1873, lire en ligne [archive] sur Gallica.
- Gastronomie, récits de table, 1874.
- Les Années de gaieté, nouvelles (1875.
- Scènes de la vie cruelle, 1876, lire en ligne [archive] sur Gallica.
- Lettres gourmandes, manuel de l'homme à table, 1877.
- Une troupe de comédiens, 1879, lire en ligne [archive] sur Gallica.
- Le Petit Paris, tableaux et figures de ce temps, 1879, lire en ligne [archive] sur Gallica.
- Les Poésies complètes de Charles Monselet, 1880.
- Mon dernier-né, gaietés parisiennes, 1883.
- Encore un !, 1885, lire en ligne [archive] sur Gallica.
- Petits mémoires littéraires, 1885, lire en ligne [archive] sur Gallica.
- Jean de La Réole, roman (1888, lire en ligne [archive] sur Gallica.
- De A à Z, portraits contemporains, 1888, lire en ligne [archive] sur Gallica.
- Mes souvenirs littéraires, 1888.
- Promenades d'un homme de lettres. Nord, ouest, est, sud, 1889, lire en ligne [archive] sur Gallica.
- Sous le manteau : nouvelles, 1889, [archive] sur Gallica — réédité sous le titre Petits péchés, 1893.
- Curiosités littéraires et bibliographiques, 1890.
- Fantaisies, 1895, lire en ligne [archive] sur Gallica.
