= James Granger =

English clergyman and writer (1723–1776)

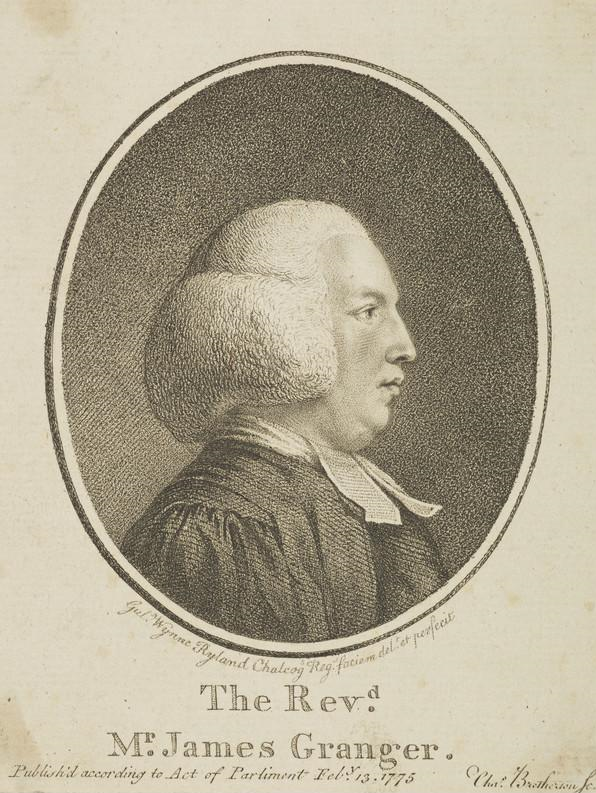
- Born: 1723; Shaftesbury, England
- Died: 1776 (aged 52–53)
- Occupations: English clergyman, writer

James Granger (1723–1776) was an English clergyman, biographer, and print collector. He is now known as the author of the Biographical History of England from Egbert the Great to the Revolution (1769). Granger was an early advocate of animal rights.

== Life ==
The son of William Granger, by Elizabeth Tutt, daughter of Tracy Tutt, he was born of poor parents at Shaftesbury, Dorset. On 26 April 1743 he matriculated at Christ Church, Oxford, but left the university without taking a degree.

Having entered into holy orders, he was presented to the vicarage of Shiplake, Oxfordshire, living a quiet life there. His political views gave rise to Samuel Johnson's remark: ‘The dog is a whig. I do not like much to see a whig in any dress, but I hate to see a whig in a parson's gown.’ Preparation of the materials for his Biographical History brought him into correspondence with many collectors of engraved portraits and students of English biography.

In 1773 or 1774, he accompanied Lord Mountstuart on a tour to Holland, where his companion made an extensive collection of portraits. Some time before his death he tried unsuccessfully to obtain a living within a moderate distance of Shiplake. On Sunday, 14 April 1776, he performed divine service apparently in his usual health, but, while in the act of administering the sacrament, was seized with an apoplectic fit, and died next morning.

A portrait of him was in the possession of his brother, John Granger, who died at Basingstoke on 21 March 1810, aged 82. His collection of upwards of 14,000 engraved portraits was dispersed by Greenwood in 1778.

Before the publication of the first edition of Granger's work in 1769 five shillings was considered a good price by collectors for any English portrait. After the appearance of the Biographical History, books, ornamented with engraved portraits, rose in price to five times their original value, and few could be found unmutilated. In 1856, Joseph Lilly and Joseph Willis, booksellers, each offered for sale an illustrated copy of Granger's work. Lilly's copy, which included Noble's 'Continuation,' was illustrated by more than thirteen hundred portraits, bound in 27 vols., price £42. The price of Willis's copy, which contained more than three thousand portraits, bound in 19 vols., was £38 10s. It had cost the former owner nearly £200.

The following collections have been published in illustration of Granger's work: (a) ‘Portraits illustrating Granger's Biographical History of England’ (known under the name of ‘Richardson's Collection’), 6 pts. Lond. 1792–1812; (b) Samuel Woodburn's 'Gallery of [over two hundred] Portraits … illustrative of Granger's Biographical History of England, &c.,' Lond. 1816; (c) 'A Collection of Portraits to illustrate Granger's Biographical History of England and Noble's continuation to Granger, forming a Supplement to Richardson's Copies of rare Granger Portraits,' 2 vols. Lond. 1820–2.

== Extra-illustration ==
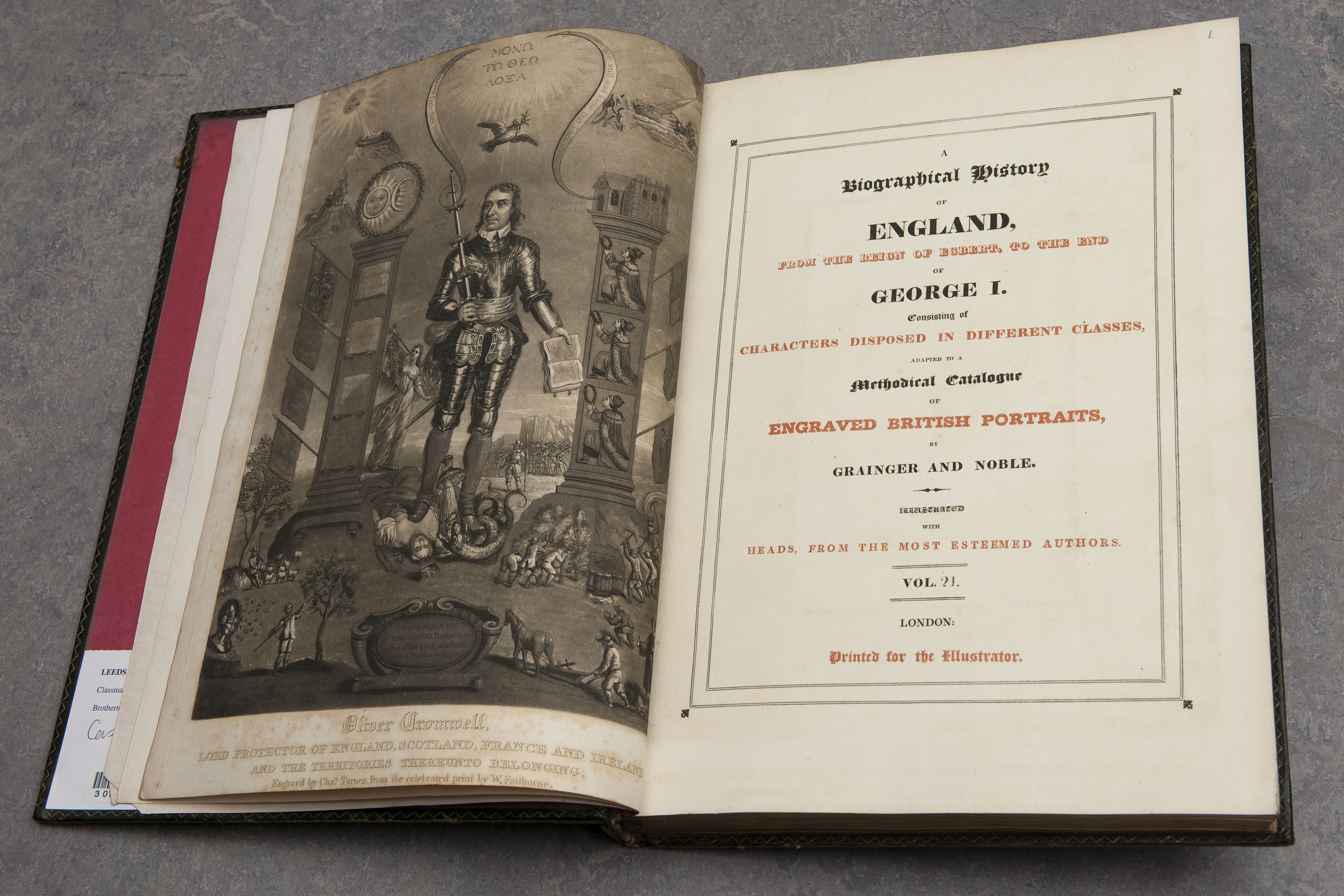
Title page of James Granger's Biographical History of England, 5th ed. (1824), extra-illustrated by William Thomas Beckford in 31 vols., (c. 1824–44). Special Collections, Brotherton Library, University of Leeds.

Extra-illustration, the process by which drawings, prints and other visual materials were interleaved with a printed text – often the history of a town, county or notable individual – is frequently called "Grangerising" or "Grangerisation." These terms, however, only came into use from the 1880s, more than a century after Granger's death. Ironically for the process of book customisation that carries his name, Granger never "grangerized" a book. There are many examples of extra-illustration, especially Granger's Biographical History. The most important and first extra-illustrated Granger was prepared by Richard Bull. Now in the Huntington Library, California, it contains over 14,000 prints across 36 volumes. Another was prepared by the Bristol antiquarian George Weare Braikenridge, who "grangerized" his copy of the Biographical History with nearly 4,000 portraits. His main interest, however, was in extra-illustrating his copy of William Barrett's History and Antiquities of the City of Bristol.

== Animal rights ==
In 1772, Granger preached a sermon against cruelty to animals. However, during the 18th century the subject of humane treatment to animals was deemed beneath the Church and was considered abuse of the pulpit. The sermon caused an "almost universal disgust to two considerable congregations", as mention of dogs and horses was regarded as a "prostitution of the dignity of the pulpit". Granger went to prison for preaching twice against cruelty to animals.

The sermon was published as An Apology for the Brute Creation (1772). In his day, the sermon was unpopular and only one hundred copies had been sold by January, 1773. However, it was positively reviewed in the Monthly Review and the Critical Review as a sensible discourse. The sermon influenced Arthur Broome, one of the founders of the Society for the Prevention of Cruelty to Animals.

== Works ==
His works are:

- Biographical History of England, from Egbert the Great to the Revolution, consisting of Characters dispersed in different Classes, and adapted to a Methodical Catalogue of Engraved British Heads. Intended as an Essay towards reducing our Biography to System, and a help to the knowledge of Portraits; with a variety of Anecdotes and Memoirs of a great number of persons not to be found in any other Biographical Work. With a preface, showing the utility of a collection of Engraved Portraits to supply the defect, and answer the various purposes of Medals, 2 vols. Lond. 1769, and a supplement consisting of corrections and large additions, 1774; 2nd edit. 4 vols. 1775; 3rd edit. 4 vols. 1779; 4th edit. 4 vols. 1804; 5th edit., with upwards of four hundred additional lives, 6 vols. 1824. A continuation of the work from the revolution of 1688 to the end of the reign of George I appeared in 3 vols. Lond. 1806, from manuscripts left by Granger and the collections of the editor, Mark Noble.
- An Apology for the Brute Creation, or Abuse of Animals censured, 1772. This sermon was preached in his church on 18 October 1772, and, as a postscript states, gave almost universal disgust to his parishioners, as "the mention of horses and dogs was censured as a prostitution of the dignity of the pulpit, and considered as a proof of the author's growing insanity".
- The Nature and Extent of Industry, a sermon preached before the Archbishop of Canterbury in the parish church of Shiplake on 4 July 1775. This was dedicated: "To the inhabitants of the parish of Shiplake who neglect the service of the church, and spend the Sabbath in the worst kind of idleness, this plain sermon, which they never heard, and probably will never read, is inscribed by their sincere well-wisher and faithful minister, J. G." This and the previous discourse were well received by the public.
- Letters between the Rev. James Granger, M.A. [sic], and many of the most eminent Literary Men of his time: composing a copious history and illustration of the Biographical History of England. With Miscellanies and Notes of Tours in France, Holland, and Spain, by the same Gentleman, London, 1805, edited by James Peller Malcolm, author of Londinium Redivivum.
