= Gérard Piogey =

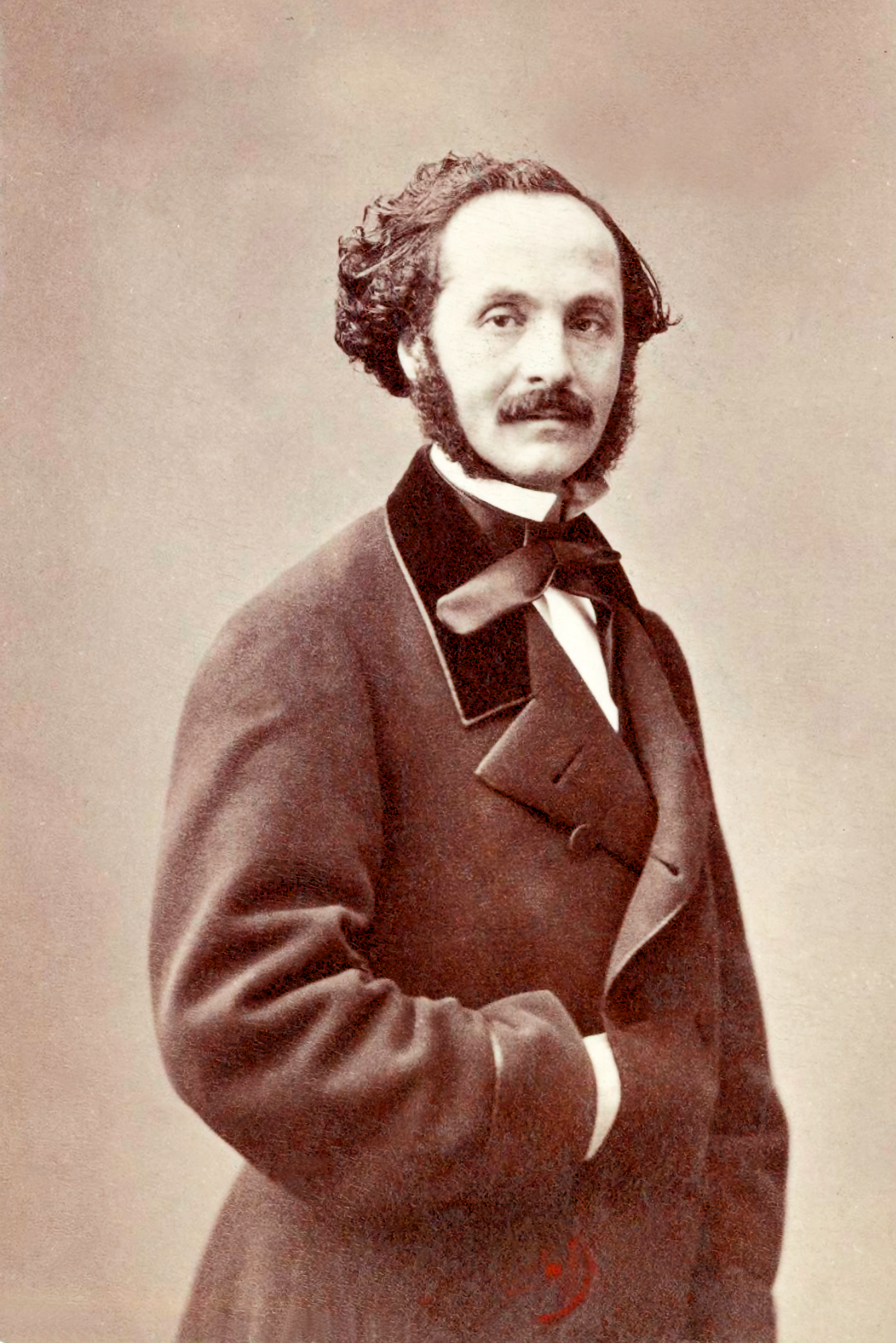
- Born: June 2, 1820
- Died: November 18, 1894 (aged 74)

Gérard Piogey (June 2, 1820 – November 18, 1894) was a French doctor and collector.

== Biography ==
The son of a grocer, Piogey came to Paris without a sou in his pocket, before his profession allowed him to rapidly earn money.

Honorary president of the Central Association of French Practitioners, head doctor of the asile de la Providence, Dr. Piogey cared for several generations of poets and writers. He was notably the friend and doctor of Baudelaire, Théodore de Banville, Charles Asselineau, Champfleury, and Carjat.

As a collector, he had gathered, during the twenty years he lived at the hôtel Auber, rue Saint-Georges, an eclectic selection of curiosities and works of art, with a predilection for the 18th century. This collection included commodes, visiting cards, and portraits of women and fans, which have been on display for many years at the Musée des Arts Décoratifs.

His exemplary behavior during the third cholera pandemic gained him a medal of honor in 1850. The services he rendered during the Siege of Paris as major in the national guard earned him a promotion to offer of the Legion of Honor. The Académie de médecine awarded him a Montyon Prize for his studies on the scabies mite. He died after falling ill from a disease of the throat.

== Published works ==
- Réflexions pratiques sur la gale de l’homme
- Anus artificiel, injections de bouillons dans l’intestin non parcouru par les matières stomacales : observation et réflexions
- Considérations sur la scarlatine, l'anasarque scarlatineuse, et leur traitement (Thèse de médecine, Paris, 1851)
