= Paul Arène =

French writer

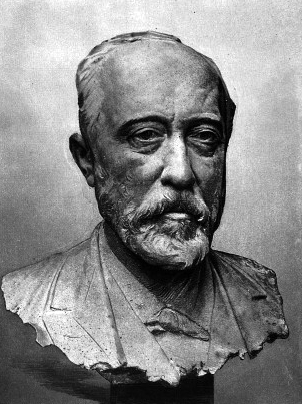
Bust of Paul Arène, by Jean-Antoine Injalbert, 1897.

Paul-Auguste Arène (26 June 1843 – 17 December 1896) was a Provençal poet and French writer.

== Biography ==
Arène was born in Sisteron, Alpes-de-Haute-Provence, the son of Adolphe, a clockmaker, and Reine, a cap presser. He studied in Marseille, then in Vannes. A short play which enjoyed some success at the Odéon, Pierrot héritier, led him to leave the university, and to journalism in 1865, aged 23. He started to contribute to Figaro littéraire and composed his first Provençal verses, which were published in the Almanach avignonnais by Joseph Roumanille. He died in Antibes.

The subject of all of his Provençal pieces is the area, and particularly the countryside, around Sisteron: Fontfrediero, Lis Estello negro, Raubatori.

In French, Paul Arène published Parnassiculet, in which he talked about his life, in the style of Parnassianism. Like his friend Octave Mirbeau in 1884, Paul Arène collaborated actively with Alphonse Daudet in the publishing of his Provençal chronicles, published in the newspaper L'Événement. In 1869, some of them were republished under the title Lettres de mon moulin (attributed solely to Daudet).

In 1868, Paul Arène wrote his chef-d'œuvre, Jean des Figues. After 1870, he wrote chronicles, poems, among which Le Tor d'Entraÿs, Le Clos des âmes, Le Canot des six capitaines, Au Bon Soleil and La Gueuse parfumée, and two collections. He also wrote La Chèvre d'or, Les Ogresses, Le Midi bouge and Domnine.

== Publications ==
- Pierrot Héritier (1865).
- Jean-des-Figues (1868).
- Les Comédiens Errants (1873, with V. Vernier).
- Un Duel aux Lanternes (1873).
- L'Ilote (1875, with Charles Monselet).
- Le Char (1875, with Alphonse Daudet).
- La Gueuse Parfumée (1876).
- Le Prologue sans le Savoir (1877, with Henri d'Erville).
- Contes de Noël (1879).
- Les Contes en Cent Lignes (1880).
- Au Bon Soleil (1880).
- Paris Ingénu (1882).
- La Vraie Tentation du Grand Saint-Antoine (1880).
- Vingt Jours en Tunisie (1884).
- Mobilier Scolaire (1886).
- Contes de Paris. Contes de Provence. L'Âne de Nazaire. La Mule (1887).
- La Chèvre d'Or (1889).
- Nouveaux Contes de Noël (1891).
- Le Midi Bouge (1891).
- Les Ogresses (1891).
- Des Alpes aux Pyrénées (1892, with Albert Tournier).
- Domnine (1894).
- Friquette et Friquets (1896).

Posthumous

- Le Secret de Polichinelle (1897).
- La Veine d'Argile (1928).

Works in English translation

- The Golden Goat (1921).

== See also ==
- A Clinical Lesson at the Salpêtrière – 1887 group tableau portrait by André Brouillet
