= Fernand Desnoyers =

Félix Desnoyers
- Born: Félix-Emile-Arthur Desnoyers; 10 September 1826; Paris
- Died: 5 November 1869 (aged 43); 15th arrondissement of Paris
- Occupations: Homme de lettres, critic

Fernand Desnoyers, full name Félix-Emile-Arthur Desnoyers, (10 September 1826 – 5 November 1869) was a 19th-century French writer and literary critic.

The journalist and playwright Edmond de Biéville (1814–1880) was his brother.

== Biography ==
He was part of Henry Murger's circle and an editor at the Polichinelle.

When he died, the paper Le Temps 8 November 1869 read:

M. Fernand Desnoyers died yesterday from consumption, of which he felt the first attacks in 1866. Mr. de Biéville, the theater critic of Le Siècle was his brother. Mr. Desnoyers had withdrawn from the world of letters in recent years. His poems, novels were quickly forgotten; Yet he held a position in public esteem and a better rank in the letters. His poems have been published in magazines, newspapers. He founded a publication that lasted five years, the Almanach parisien.

== Publications ==
- 1853: Chants et chansons de la bohême, illustrés de 26 jolis dessins par Nadar, with contributions by Henry Murger, Pierre Dupont, Gustave Mathieu, Antonio Watripon, Léon Noel, Charles Vincent, Pierre Bry, Louis Barré, Benjamin Gastineau, Édouard Plouvier, Alfred Delvau, Charles Guignard, Abel Duvernoy, Chatillon, in-12, J. Bry aîné libraire-éditeur, Paris
- 1856: Le Bras noir, pantomime in verse by Ferdinand Desnoyers, représentée pour la première fois, à Paris, par le Théâtre des Folies-Nouvelles, 8 février 1856, dessin d'après Courbet, Librairie théâtrale, Paris
- 1860: Almanach parisien pour 1860, 1ère année, in-12, E. Pick de l'Isère, Paris
- 1861: Le Théâtre de Polichinelle : Prologue en vers par Ferdinand Desnoyers pour l'ouverture du Théâtre de marionnettes dans le jardin des Tuileries, in-4, Auguste Poulet-Malassis and de Broise, Paris
- 1861 : Almanach parisien pour 1861, 2ème année, in-12, E. Pick de l'Isère, Paris
- 1862 : Étrennes parisiennes : Petit tableau de Paris illustré, avec un nouveau calendrier pour 1862 : Mœurs, curiosités, coutumes, histoire, littérature, anecdotes, récits pittoresques, poésie, science, arts, bals, théâtres, etc. etc. by Ferdinand Desnoyers, with the assistance of Théophile Gautier, Charles Baudelaire ..., E. Pick de l'Isère, Paris
- 1863 : Salon des refusés. La peinture en 1863, Azur Dutil éditeur, Paris
- 1864 : Une journée de Pick de l'Isère, suivie de quelques aventures du Gil Blas de la librairie française, Imprimerie Simon Raçon et compagnie, Paris
- 1865: Chansons parisiennes, E. Pick de l'Isère éditeur, Paris
- 1867: Muséum contemporain 5. Feld-Maréchal Benedeck. Biographies, Robe, Paris
- 1869: Le vin, vers fantasques. La campagne, in-12, Alcan-Lévy, Paris

== Sources ==
- Antoine Laporte, Histoire littéraire du dix-neuvième siècle manuel critique et raisonné: de livres rares, curieux et singuliers ... supplément de brunet, de quérard, de Barier, etc., Volume 3
