= Auguste Luchet =

French playwright, journalist, novelist and writer

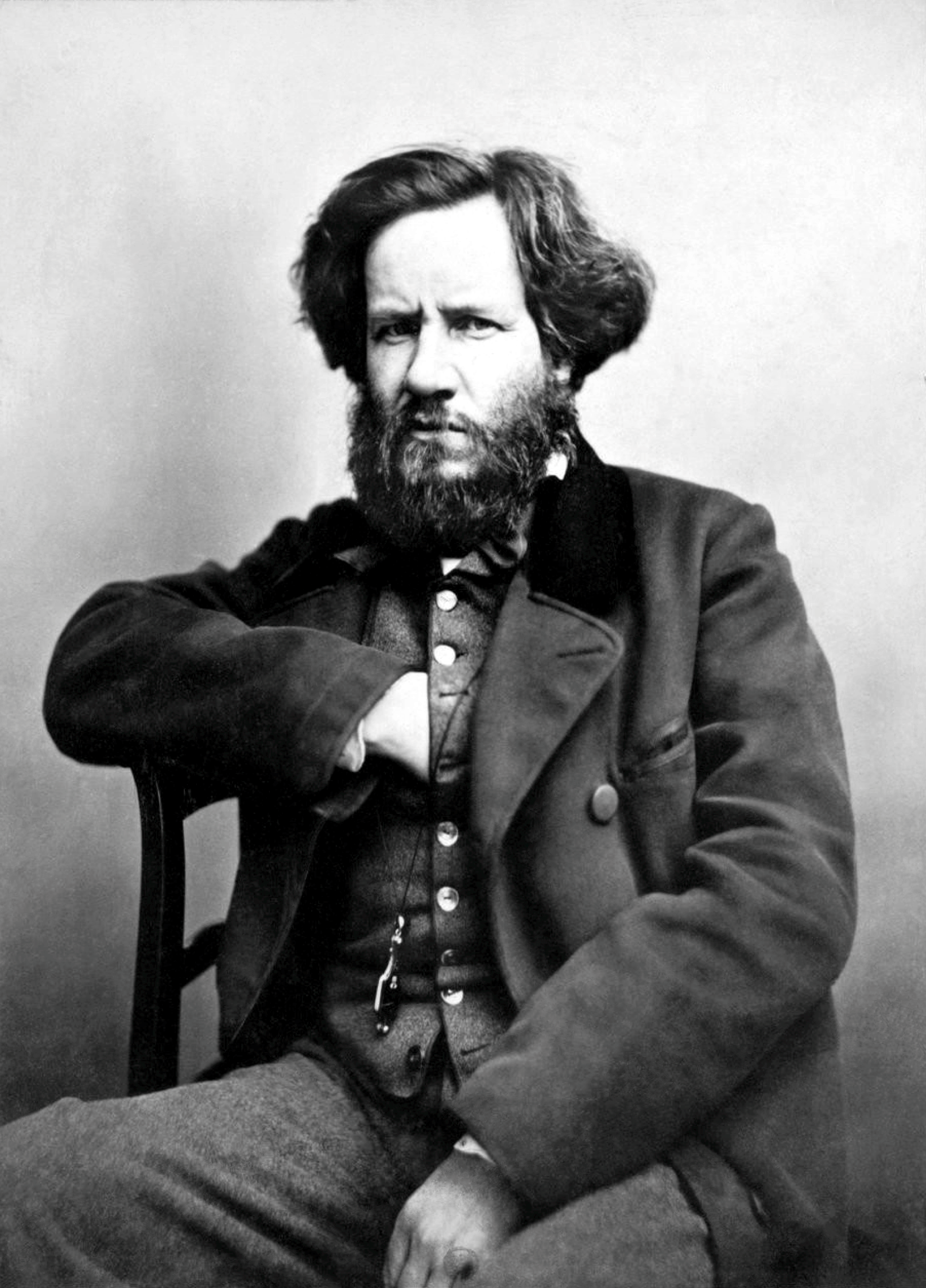
- Auguste Luchet par Nadar, c. 1855
- Born: 22 April 1806; Paris, France
- Died: 9 March 1872 (aged 65); Paris, France
- Resting place: Père Lachaise Cemetery
- Occupations: Playwright; Journalist; Novelist

Auguste Luchet (French: [oɡyst lyʃɛ]; 22 April 1806 – 9 March 1872) was a 19th-century French playwright, journalist, novelist and writer.

== Biography ==
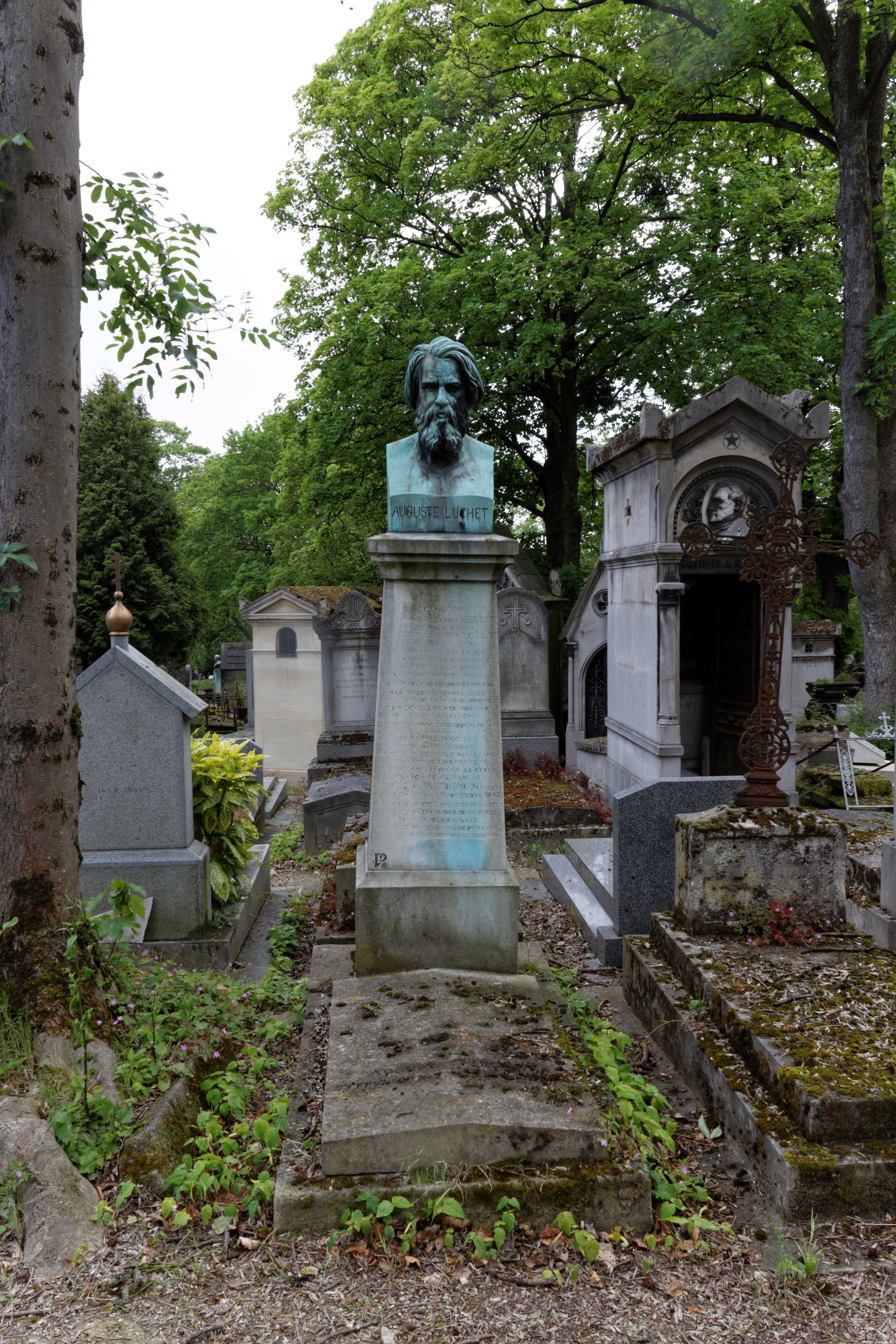
Auguste Luchet's grave at Père Lachaise Cemetery

The son of a civil servant, Luchet was raised in Dieppe where his parents had moved in 1813. A brilliant student but from a family with no fortune, he was placed aged 13 in an office of the Dieppe court of justice. He then worked by a ship owner and a banker and, in 1823, decided to leave for Paris where he wanted to go into literature. He was then employed by a merchant of the rue Saint-Martin, which completely disgusted him with the trading world, a feeling he expressed later in his autobiographical novel Frère et soeur. He spent some time by a merchant of sheets before getting into journalism.

Unfortunately, he soon found himself homeless and spent two years in misery before finding a stenographer position at the Chamber of Deputies where he met, among others, Alphonse Rabbe, Louis Reybaud and Léon Gozlan who allowed him to enter their political review La Jeune France.

Spotted by Jacques Coste, he became a journalist at Le Temps, then joined the Journal de Paris and took an active part to the July Revolution of 1830, which earned him a five-year exile in Belgium, then in Jersey. A collaborator with Talisman, Le Siècle (1849), the Républicain de Seine-et-Marne (1850) and the magazine La Vigne (1866), his plays were given on the most prestigious Parisian stages of his time including the Théâtre de l'Ambigu-Comique, the Théâtre de la Porte-Saint-Martin, and the Théâtre Beaumarchais.

In addition to some novels, he also wrote books on vine and wine. Luchet was also the governor of the château de Fontainebleau (1848). His novel Le Nom de famille earned him a two-year prison sentence and a 1000 frs fine

"for incitement to hatred and contempt of the government and incitement to class hatred".

His defendant was Jules Favre.

Luchet is buried at Père Lachaise Cemetery (49th division). His bronze bust is listed in French patrimony.

== Works ==
- 1830: Paris, esquisses dédiées au peuple parisien et à M. J.-A. Dulaure
- 1832: Henri le prétendant, novel, Canel
- 1834: Le Brigand et le philosophe, drama in 5 actions, with Félix Pyat
- 1835: Ango, drama in 5 acts, six tableaux, with an epilogue, with Pyat
- 1835: Un Mariage de cour, crime et silence, Souverain
- 1836: Thadéus le ressuscité, with Michel Masson, Boulé
- 1838: Frère et sœur, novel, 2 vols., Souverain
- 1840: Justes frayeurs d'un habitant de la banlieue à propos des fortifications de Paris
- 1840: Récit de l'inauguration de la statue de Gutenberg et des fêtes données par la ville de Strasbourg les 24, 25 et 26 juin 1840, Pagnerre
- 1842: Le Nom de famille, 2 vols., Souverain
- 1844: Le Passe-partout, 2 vols., Souverain
- 1847: Le Confessionnal de sœur Marie, Souverain
- 1847: Souvenirs de Jersey, guide du voyageur français dans cette île
- 1848: Souvenirs de Fontainebleau, Reullier
- 1854: Le Cordonnier de Crécy, five-act drama, with Charles Vincent, music by Olivier Métra
- 1855: Fontainebleau, paysages, légendes, souvenirs, fantaisies, Hachette
- 1856: La Marchande du Temple, five-act drama
- 1858: Les mœurs d'aujourd'hui : le tabac, le jeu, le canot, le pourboire, la blague, la pose, le chantage, le loyer, la boutique, l'exil, Coulon-Pineau
- 1858: La Côte-d'Or à vol d'oiseau, lettres écrites à M. L. Havin, après la récolte de 1857, Michel-Lévy
- 1859: Le Clos de Vougeot et la Romanée-Conti, Bénard
- 1861: La Science du vin, lettres écrites à M. L. Havin, après la récolte de 1859, Michel-Lévy Frères
- 1862: Les mauvais côtés de la vie, souvenirs d'exil, Dentu
- 1868: L'art industriel à l'Exposition universelle de 1867 : mobilier, vêtement, aliments
- 1869: Album révolutionnaire, Proux

== Bibliography ==
- Alfred Sirven, Journaux et journalistes, vol.3, 1866, (p. 334)
- Polybiblion: revue bibliographique universelle, 1872, (p. 127) (obituary)
- Ludovic Lalanne, Dictionnaire historique de la France, 1872, (p. 1840)
- Henry Jouin, La sculpture dans les cimetières de Paris, Nouvelles archives de l'art français vol.13, 1897, (p. 159)
- Jules Moiroux, Le cimetière du Père-Lachaise, 1908, (p. 234)
- Félix Herbet, Auguste Luchet (1805-1872), étude bio-bibliographique, 1912
