= Le Rat Mort =

Restaurant in Paris

Coordinates: 48°52′55″N 2°20′15″E

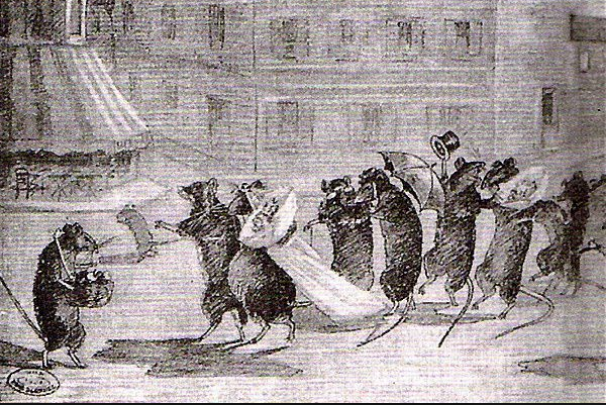
Faverot Le Mariage Le Rat mort, after a fresco painted in Le Rat Mort, circa 1890

Le Rat Mort ("The Dead Rat") was a popular cafe/restaurant and cabaret in Paris in the 19th and early 20th centuries. Located in the Place Pigalle in the Montmartre District, it was frequented by artists, writers, actors, artist models, and prostitutes, and was a gathering place for lesbians in the evenings. Paintings and sketches inspired by the cafe and its customers included work by Toulouse Lautrec, Maxime Dethomas, Auguste Chabaud and Maurice de Vlaminck.

== 1837–1850s: Origins ==
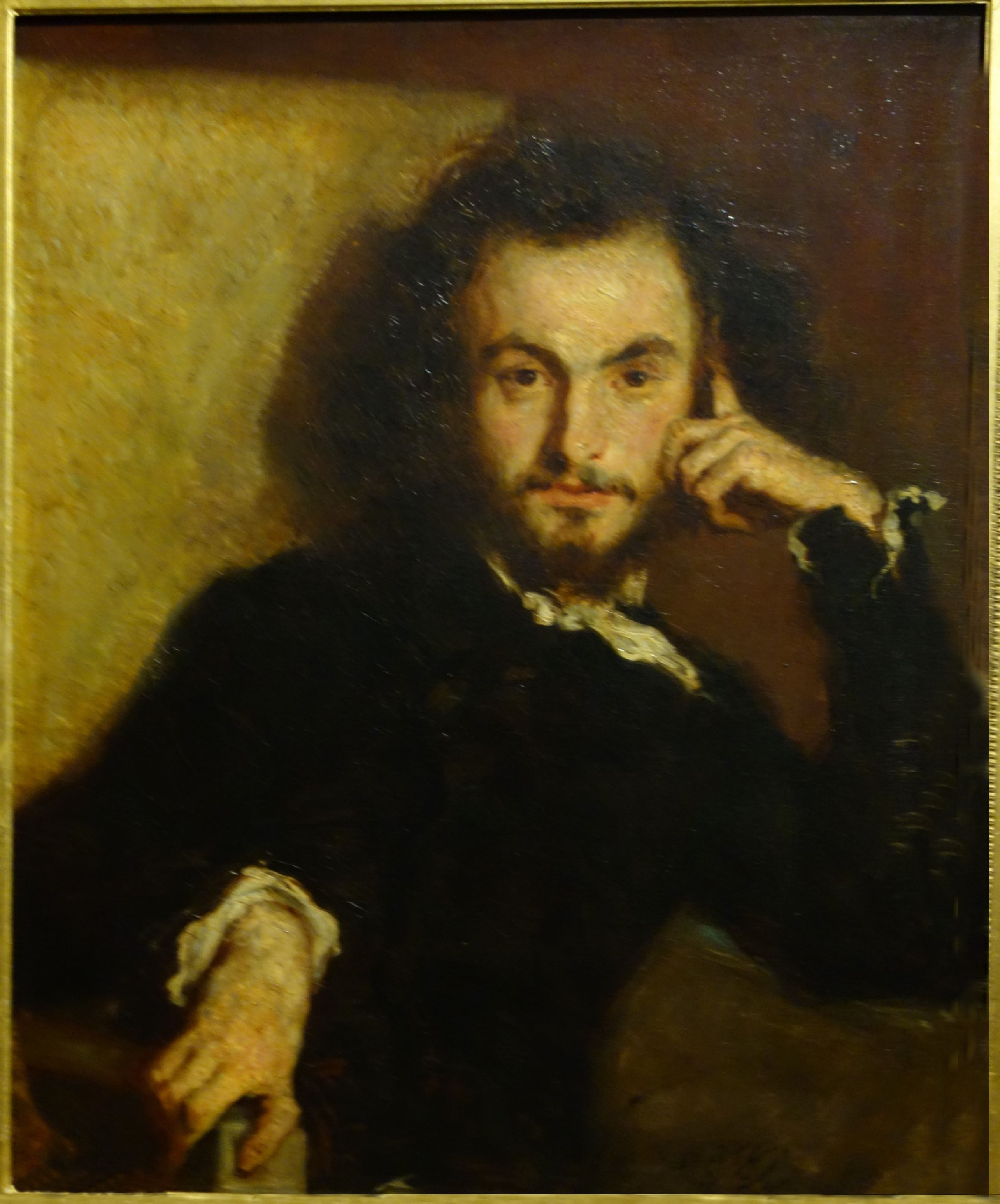
Writer Charles Baudelaire frequented Le Rat Mort in its early days.

Le Rat Mort started in 1837 as Café Pigalle at 7 Place Pigalle in the Montmartre district of Paris. It was across the street from another bohemian cafe, the Nouvelle Athènes. Shortly after the newly renovated cafe opened, one of the intellectuals who was a regular at the Nouvelle Athènes had an argument with the owner and brought his friends and his business across the street to the Café Pigalle. Because the material used to renovate the cafe had not yet dried, when the group entered the new location, someone said "It smells like a dead rat in here", and from then on the place was known as Le Rat Mort.

Other origin stories say that a dead rat was found in the beer pump of the cafe, or that the rat was killed because it interrupted a secret lovers' tryst that was taking place in one of the cafe's private rooms.

Charles Baudelaire was one of the writers who frequented Le Rat Mort in the 1850s.

When the cafe started, many of the women who visited the cafes and restaurants of Montmartre were artist models or prostitutes in search of customers, stemming from a tradition of artist models gathering at the fountain in the Place Pigalle to hire themselves out to artists.

== 1860s–1870s: Writers, revolutionaries and lesbians ==
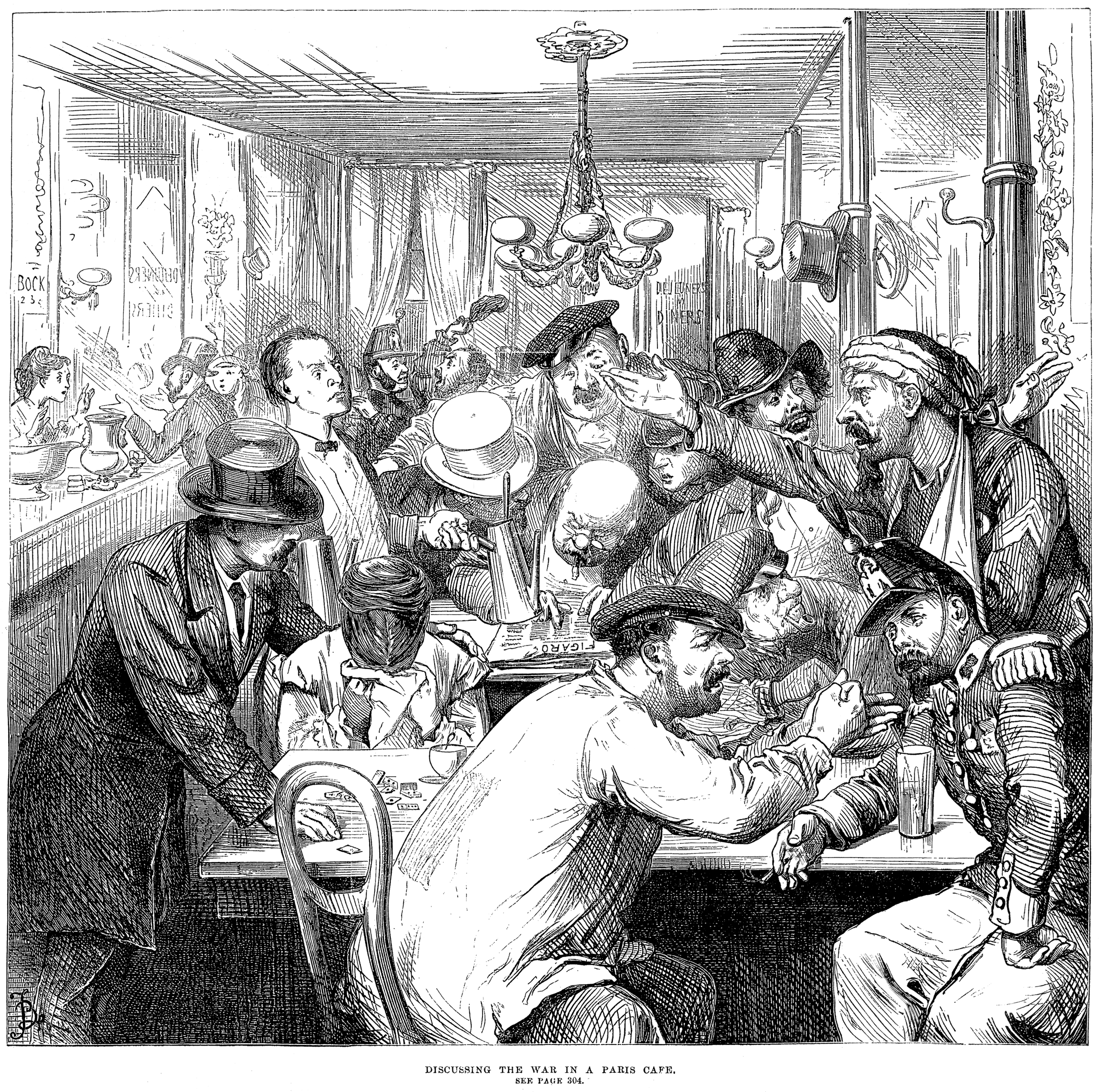
Illustration by Giovanni Boldini of a lively discussion at a French cafe, circa 1870

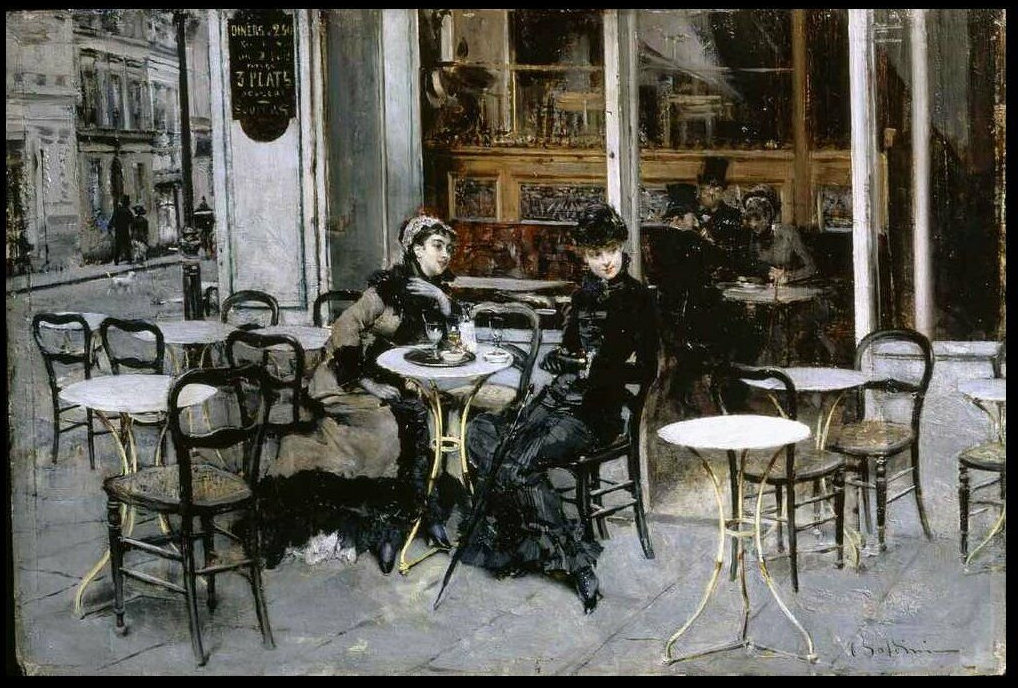
Giovanni Boldini - Conversation at the Cafe, 1877

In the 1860s–70s, the Rat Mort continued to be frequented by intellectuals and people in the arts. Customers of that time included poet Fernand Desnoyers, and writers Catulle Mendes, Henry Cantel Eugene Ceyras, Albert Merat, Leon Clodel and other poets of the Parnassian school of literature.

Some of the regulars of the Rat Mort were active in the short-lived revolutionary Paris Commune of 1871. After the fall of the commune, some did not return, but by 1874, the cafe was once again a gathering place for political and literary discussion.

By the 1870s, the cafe had also solidified its reputation as a "cafe au femmes", a "cafe for women." Women had begun gathering there since before the Paris commune, according to an 1889 article in the Paris Courier, which also published this two line poem:

Les Femmes s'en vont
au Rat Mort/
Pour réveiller
le chat qui dort

(The women go
to the Dead Rat/
to wake the sleeping cat)

The cafe's popularity with queer women led to lesbians sometimes being called "Dead Rats" because of their association with the cafe.

Gay lovers Paul Verlaine and Arthur Rimbaud were also frequent visitors to the Rat Mort, whose official name was still the Cafe Pigalle. It was there that Rimbaud told Verlaine he wanted to show him 'an experiment' and asked him to extend his wrists. Rimbaud then stabbed Verlaine in the wrists with a knife.

== 1880s–1890s: Artistry and expansion ==
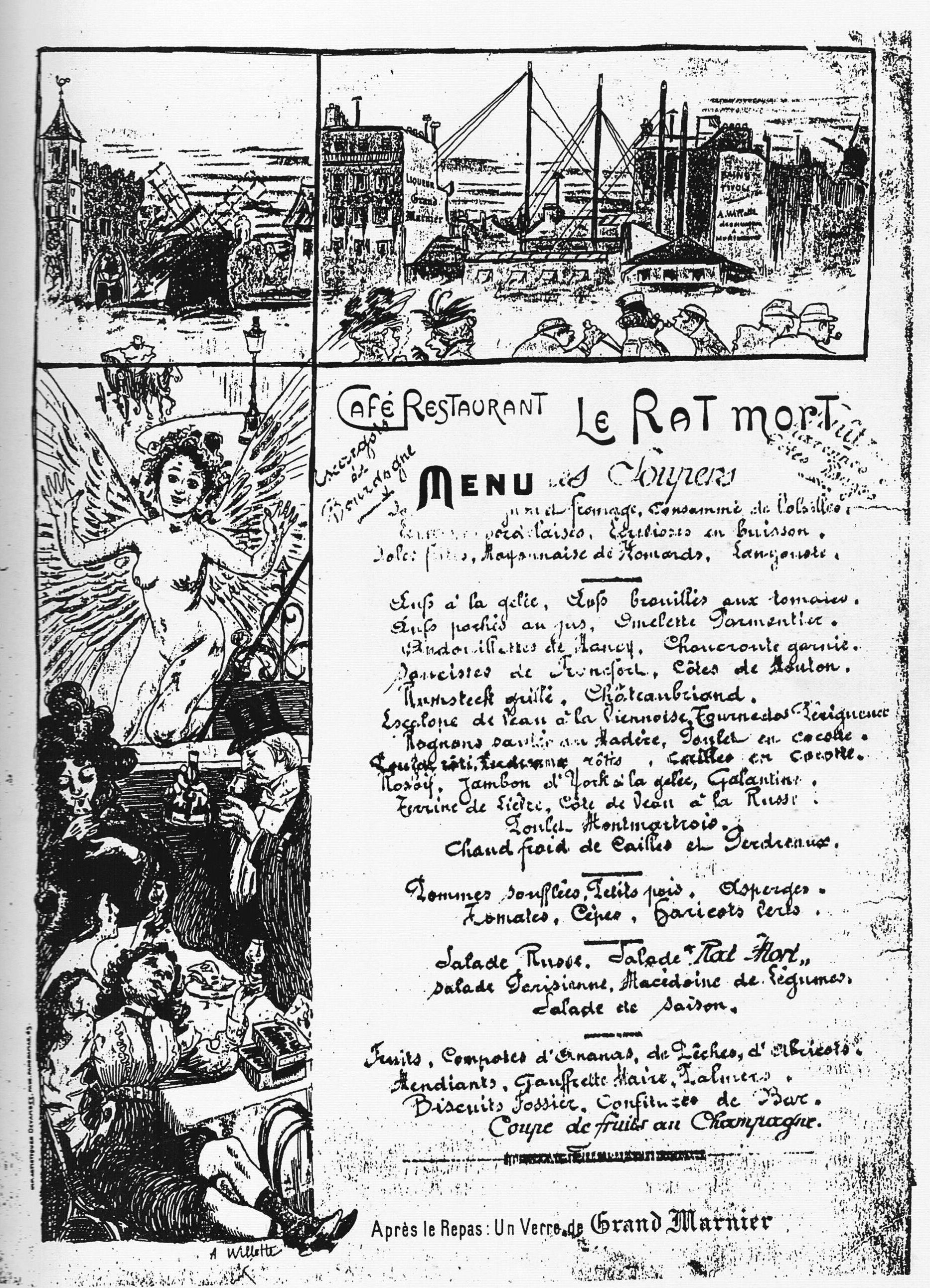
1896 Menu Le Rat Mort

A 1889 French newspaper review of the cafe/restaurant mentions the large rat painted on its ceiling by Leon Goupil, as well as its delicious onion soup, and describes it as a place that was frequented by celebrated artists and writers which had also always been a 'restaurant des femmes.' Gustave Courbet, Emile Zola and Edouard Manet were frequent visitors.

By the 1890s the cultural and artistic expression of France's Belle Epoque was well underway. The cafe was known as "one of the oldest in Montmartre" and was frequented by artists of the era, including Edgar Degas and Toulouse Lautrec, as well as artist models and sex workers. It was famous for its Second Empire interior design, which included huge mirrors and elaborate gas lamps. The painter Joseph Faverot enhanced Goupil's painting of the ceiling rat by adding frescos of the four stages of a rat's life: Baptism, Wedding, Orgy, and Death. The restaurant had two doors, an official entrance and a back door to leave by.

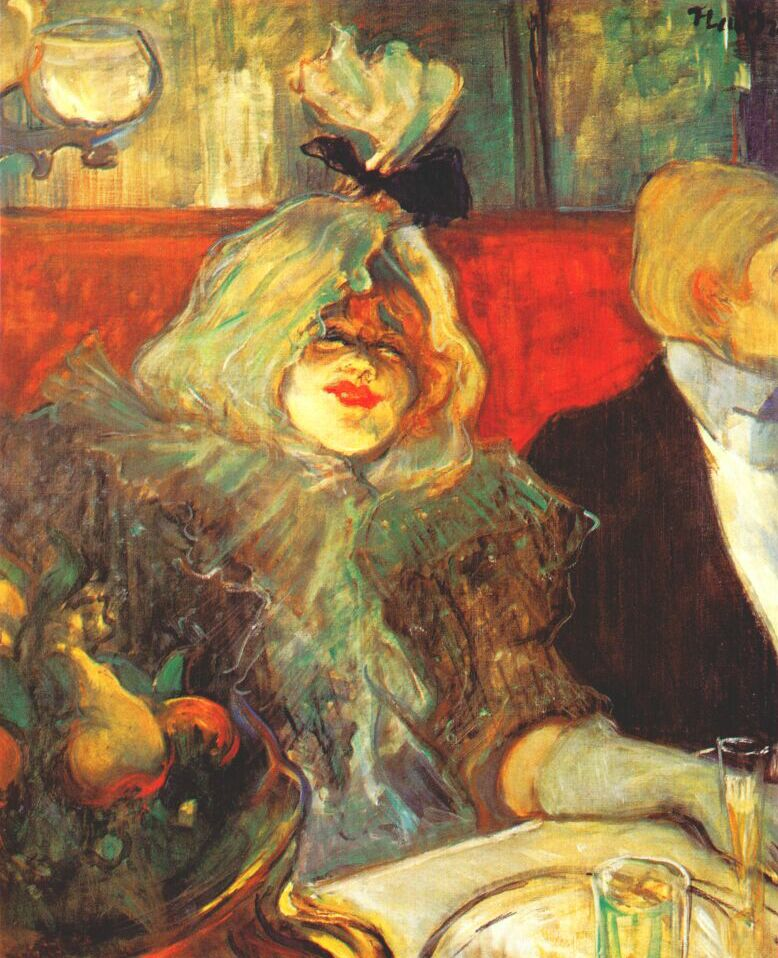
In a private room at the Rat Mort, Toulouse Lautrec, 1899

Lautrec immortalized the cafe and one of its customers in " In a Private Dining Room At the Rat Mort." (1899) The painting shows a courtesan, possibly Lucy Jourdain, seated in an intimate room intended for liaisons with sex workers.

In the late 1890s, a group of Belgian writers gathered at the Rat Mort to enjoy themselves, and had such a good time that upon returning to Belgium some of them organized the first Dead Rat Ball in 1898, Le Bal du Rat mort, an annual philanthropic costume ball that continues in the 21st century.

== 1900–1920s: Restaurant to cabaret ==
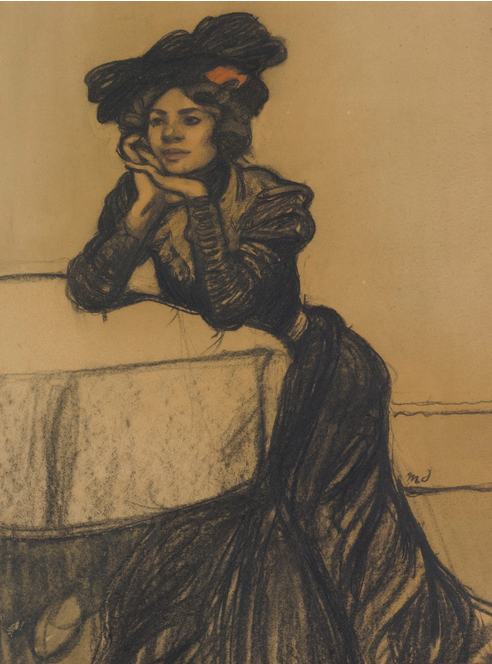
Maxime Dethomas - La Cliente du Rat Mort (Sept., 1901)

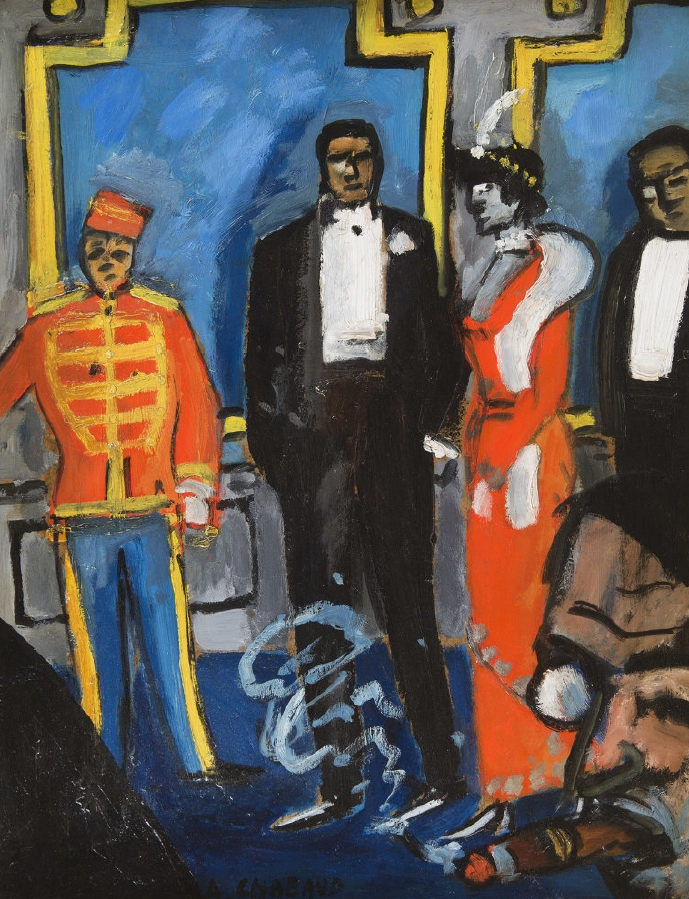
Couple entering the Rat mort, Auguste Chaubaud, ca. 1907

In 1903, Le Rat Mort was described as "one of the most celebrated restaurants" in Paris, which specialized in after hours entertainment.

The bisexual writer Colette frequented the place and once described a young female music hall dancer wearing a masculine hat as having 'that particular Rat Mort elegance.'

Painters Maxime Dethomas and Vlaminck Maurice both did portraits of women at the Rat Mort, and Auguste Chabaud depicted a couple entering the club.

During World War I, some cafes and nightclubs of Montmartre emptied out as the intellectuals and artists that frequented them were conscripted into the war.

At the same time, Black Americans discovered the cultural life of the district when some came to France as soldiers. These Americans stayed or returned after the war to work as musicians and performers, creating a thriving jazz scene in 1920s Montmartre.

Josephine Baker was a regular performer at Le Rat Mort, after she finished her gig with La Revue Negre. Another Black American performer, Lydia Jones, said, "We made lots of tips at the Rat Mort, it was a naughty place." At the time, the club was managed by members of the Corsican mafia. The Prince of Wales was also a frequent visitor during the 1920s.

By 1926 the establishment was described in a guidebook as a cabaret that was "Open from midnight to dawn" with "a celebrated orchestra, lots of beautiful women wanting customers to pay them to dance with them."

== 1930s–Present: Closure and Legacy ==
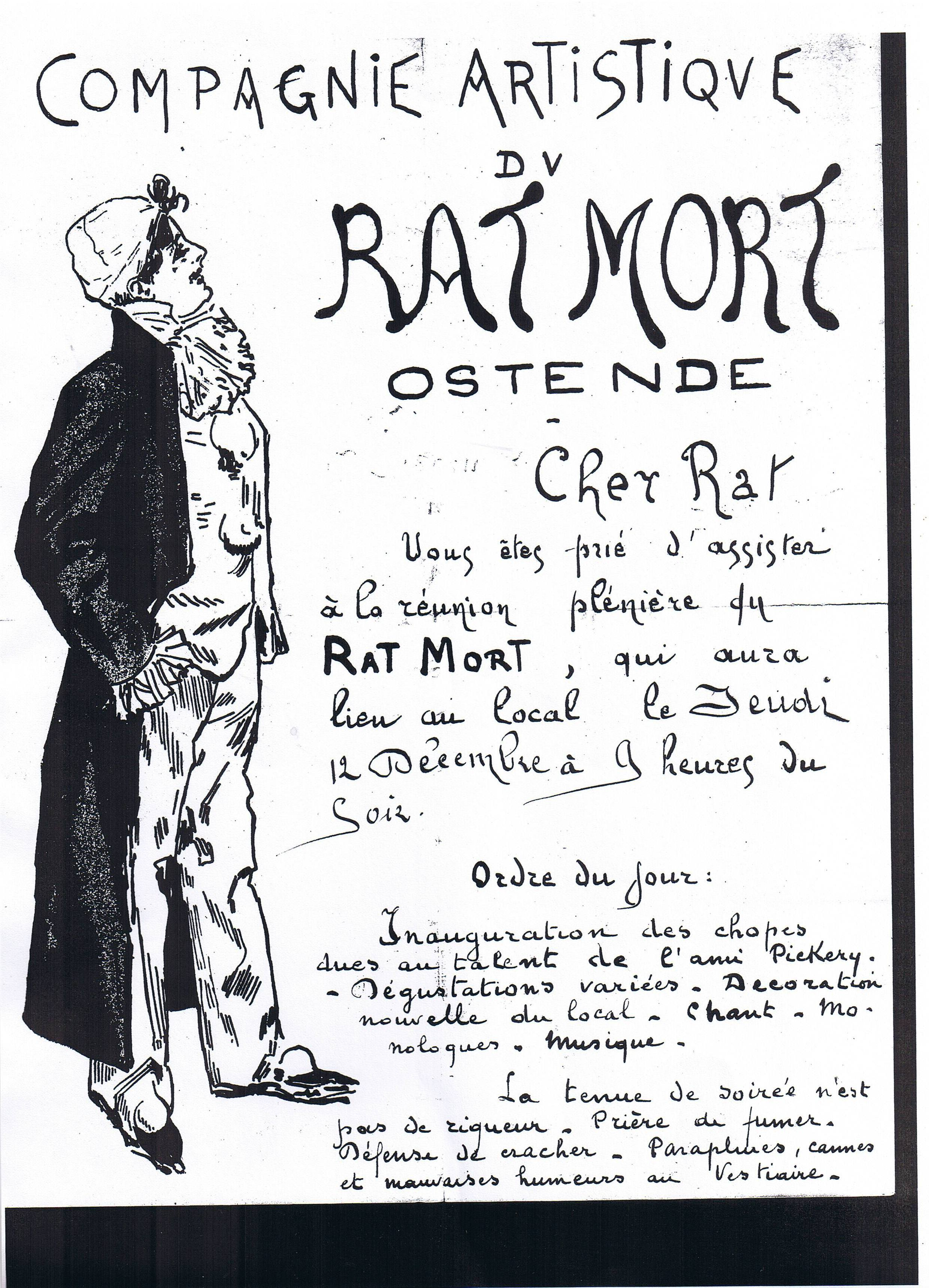
A poster for the Belgian Bal Du Rat Mort, which continues in the 21st century

The Great Depression of the 1930s brought increased crime and Mafia rivalry to the Pigalle district. In 1934, Le Rat Mort was the scene of a shooting between two members of the Corsican mafia, Jean Paul Stefani and Ange Foata. Ange's 5-year-old son was killed, but Stefani was eventually acquitted. Le Rat Mort closed shortly thereafter.

By the middle of the 20th century, a succession of other nightclubs had taken its place. As of 2023, the building where it once stood was a bank. But the site continued in the 21st century to attract visitors curious about the bohemian history of Paris.

Modern scholars have discussed the significance of Le Rat Mort to the history of art, literature, gender and LGBTQ studies.

The singer and musician Manu Chao refers to the Rat Mort in his early 21st century song La Ventura:

"Un claque à filles de mauvaise vie ù/ que Stafanì y blessa par balle/ Angelo le mafioso/ L'a eu de la chance ce vieux saloud!/ d' s'en tirer comme ca sans trop d'accrocs/ ENTRE CHIENS ET LOUPS/ QUAND TOMBE LA NUIT"

"It's at the Dead Rat in Pigalle,/ a house of ill repute,/ that Stafani shot and wounded/ Angelo the mafioso./ That old bastard got lucky!/ To get away with it like that without too many problems,/ between dogs and wolves/ when the night falls."

== Gallery ==
Additional drawings by Joseph Faverot from wall frescoes at Le Rat Mort

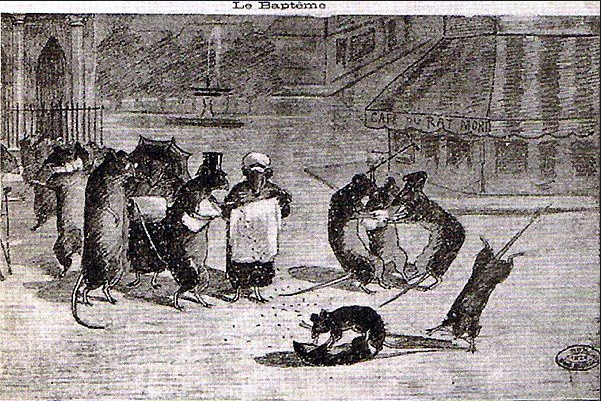
1 Baptism

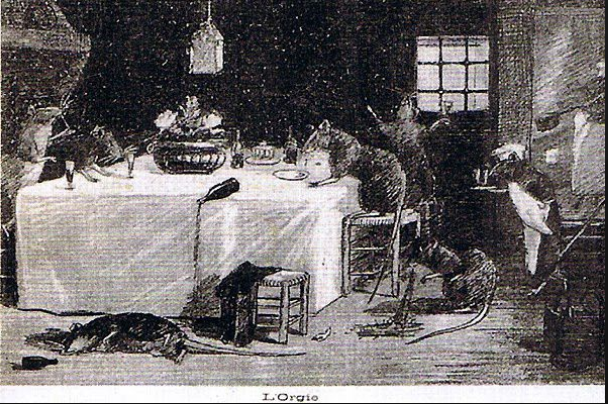
2 Orgy

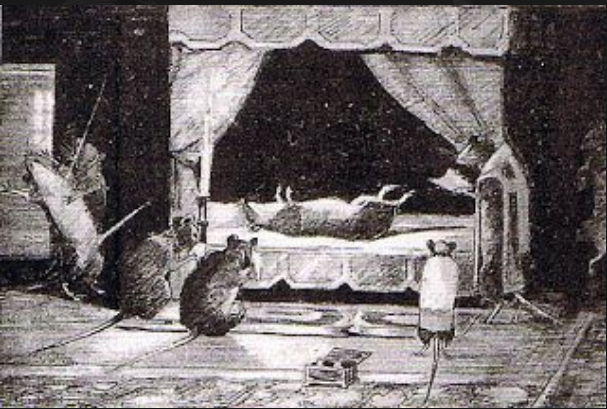
3 Death

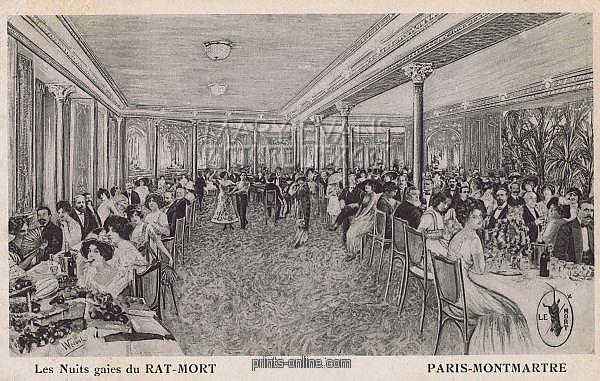
4 Interior of Le Rat Mort

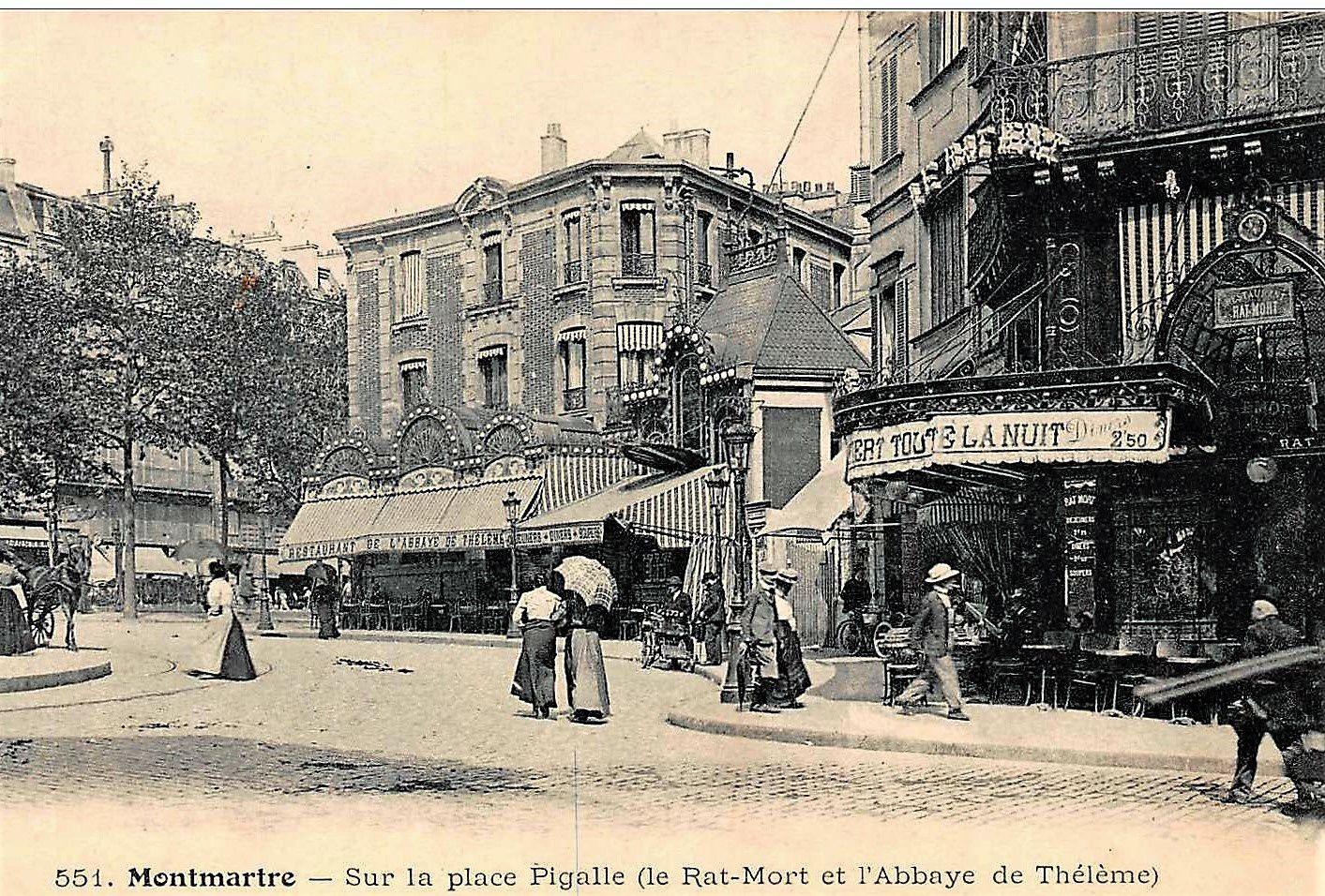
5 Exterior of Le Rat Mort in Place Pigalle

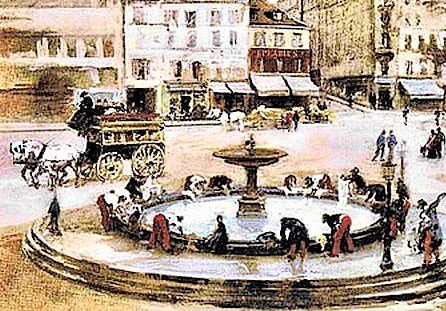
6 Artist models seeking clients near the Place Pigalle Fountain visited Le Rat Mort in its early days
