= Michel Masson =

French writer

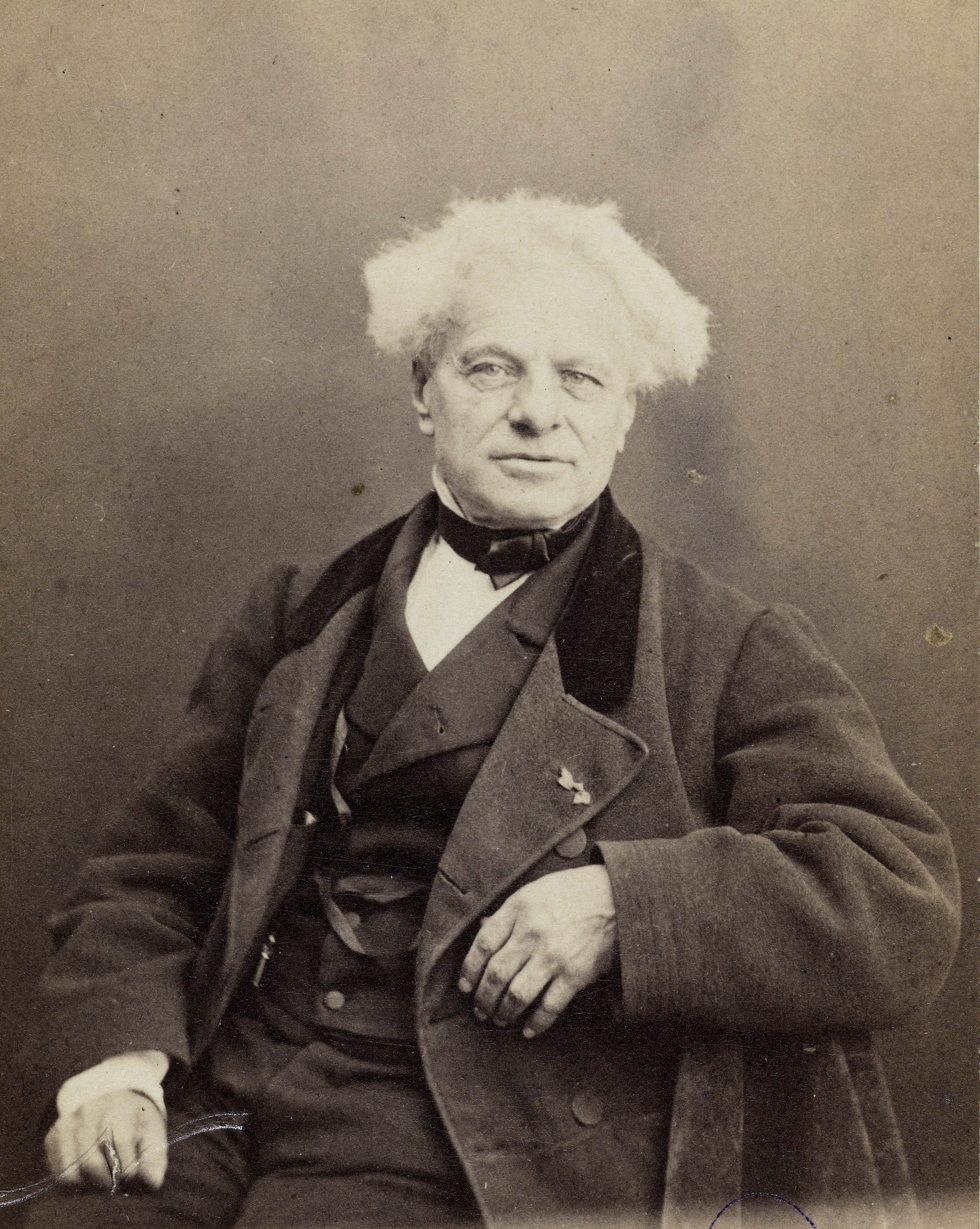
- Michel Masson, photograph by Nadar
- Born: Auguste-Michel-Benoît Gaudichot; 31 July 1800; Former 3rd arrondissement of Paris, France
- Died: 23 April 1883 (aged 82); Paris, France
- Occupations: Playwright, journalist, novelist

Auguste-Michel-Benoît Gaudichot pseudonym: Michel Masson (31 July 1800 – 12 thermidor an VIII- – 23 April 1883) was a French playwright, journalist and novelist of the 19th century.

== Biography ==
A worker's son, he began acting at age 10 and played the roles of children in several plays. He was danser at the Théâtre Monthabor, but he had only little success. So he stopped as a danser, and took a job as an apprentice in a bookshop. There he saw other starting authors like M.Champfleury. Masson liked reading books, and he started writing too. But he did not like the commercial side of his job. He worked a time as a café waiter. Masson started writing articles for newspapers, the quality of his work was recognized, and articles of his hand were published in newspapers like Les Nouveautés, the Mercure de France and La Lorgnette. (journal des théâtres, de la littérature, des arts, des moeurs, des modes et de la librairie, pour Paris, les départemens et l'étranger) He was asked to join the redaction of Le Figaro, where he collaborated until 1831.

His plays were presented on several Parisian stages of the 19th century, including the Théâtre du Vaudeville, the Théâtre des Variétés, the Théâtre des Nouveautés, the Théâtre du Gymnase, the Théâtre du Palais-Royal, and the Théâtre de la Porte-Saint-Martin.

Masson was the name of his mother: Nicole Agnès Masson. He also wrote under the pseudonym Michel Raymond, when working with Raymond Brucker, and authored, among others, several novels, including some for children.

Long before he started writing for theater, Michel Masson had established his reputation as a writer of novels. His roman debut was received with high praise by the critics. It was written in cooperation with Raymond Brucker, Le Maçon (1829, 4 vol. in-12) and published under the pseudonym Michel Raymond. The merger of both their first names. But in those days Brucker also worked with the less known Léon Gozlan on another book: Les Intimes. And riding on the success of Le Maçon Brucker also used the name Michel Raymond for this book. Michel Masson made no objections to this, but thereupon he ended any cooperation with Brucker. To take advantage of the pseudonym himself, Michel first published two volumes of Daniel, le Lapidaire, ou les Contes de l'Atelier (1832-1833) also under the name Michel Raymond. They had a great success, and vol 3 and 4 he published under his own name: Michel Masson. Most of the stories of this bundle were later edited for the theatre.

On 18 February 1824, Michel Masson married Françoise Deliége. Of this marriage 5 children were born, but only one survived. After a 47-year long marriage Françoise died February 1871. Shortly after this, April 1873, Michel Masson remarried with Clémence Hadingue, the daughter of an actress, and at the age of 74, he was again a father. Reason enough for Mr. Hippolyte Masson - the son from his first marriage - to start a lawsuit in which he claimed, as heir of his mother, his legacy. (Mostly the money he expected of all the books and other publications of his father) The verdict was in favor of the son.

His 1834 novel "Un Cœur d'une Jeune Fille" drew the ire of Edgar Allan Poe, who attacked it for being too 'suggestive' in the "Democratic Review" (1844, vol.17 issue 78, pg 583). His 1831 novel Le Grain de Sable inspired Multatuli writing his play Vorstenschool or School of Princes (1872).

== Works ==
=== 1828-1829 ===
- 1828: Le Maçon. mœurs populaires, Michel Raymond (Michel Masson and Raymond Brucker), edition A. Dupont et Cie (Paris) (4 vol.; in-16) 1828
- 1829: Les cuisiniers diplomates, one-act comédie en vaudevilles, Rochefort, Barthélemy and Masson, first performance at the Royal Theatre, in Berlin, April 1829, edition: Schlesinger, Berlin 1829
- 1829: Le Tir au pistolet, comédie en vaudevilles in 1 act and 2 tableaux, with Charles Adolphe
- 1829: Le garde de nuit ou Le bal masqué, comédie en vaudevilles in 3 acts, with Mélesville
- 1829: Frétillon, ou la Bonne fille, comédie en vaudevilles in 1 act, with Philippe Dumanoir
- 1829: Le Procès du baiser, comédie en vaudevilles in 2 acts

=== 1830-1834 ===
- 1830: À-propos patriotique, Villeneuve and Masson, premiered in Paris, at the Théâtre des Nouveautés, 2 August 1830, edition: Riga (Paris), (12 p.; in-8) 1830
- 1830: Le Collège de *** ou Souvenirs de la Suisse en 1794, comédie en vaudevilles
- 1831: Les Pilules dramatiques ou le Choléra-morbus, revue critique et politique in 1 act
- 1831: Le grand prix ou Le voyage à frais communs, opéra comique in 3 acts, music by Adolphe Adam
- 1831: Daniel, le lapidaire, ou les Contes de L'atelier, four volumes
  - 1831: first edition: vol 1 & 2 under the pseudonym Michel Raymond, vol 3 & 4: Michel Masson
  - 1833: third edition: 4 volumes signed Michel Masson, story bundle: (1) La femme du Réfractaire, Une Mère, La Complainte (2) La Maitrise, l’Enseigne, Le Grain de Sable, (3) l’Inévitable, Annah l’Hébétée, (4) La Fabrique, Un nom à tout prix, Les deux Rois.
    - The plot of the play "Vorstenschool" (1870) or "School for Princes" of Multatuli is almost entirely derived from the novel "Le Grain de Sable" (the grain of Sand).
- 1832: Mon oncle Thomas,
- 1832: Les Deux frères, comedy by Kotzebue, translated by Joseph Patrat, remise in 2 acts and in vaudeville
- 1832: Atar-Gull, melodrama in 3 actes and 6 tableaux, after the roman of Eugène Sue, by Auguste Anicet-Bourgeois and Masson, First performance at the Théâtre L'Ambigu-Comique, 26 April 1832, edition: Barbré (Paris) (15 p.: fig. au titre; in-4) 1872*1832: La ferme de Bondi, ou Les deux réfractaires : épisode de l'Empire in 4 acts, Gabriel de Lurieu (1795?-1869), Ferdinand de Villeneuve and Michel Masson, First performance at the Théâtre du Palais-Royal, 5 May 1832, edition: [J.-N. Barba] (P. 95-118; in-4) 1838
- 1832: Le Bateau de blanchisseuses, tableau-vaudeville in 1 act, Villeneuve, Masson et Charles. First performance in Paris at the Théâtre du Palais-Royal, 11 June 1832, edition: Marchant (Paris) (In-8°, 28 p. ) 1832
- 1833: Thadéus le Ressuscité, histoire originale et sombre (2 vol. in-8°) with Auguste Luchet;
  - 1836: edition: A. Dupont (Paris) (2 vol. in-8°) 4th edition, 1836
  - 1844: edition: Boulé (Paris) (1 vol. (224 p.); gr. in-8) Les mille et un romans. t. 4
- 1833: Quatre époques de la vie de S.A.R. Madame, duchesse de Berry, suivies des Protestations et adresses de toutes les villes de France en faveur de Son Altesse Royale, by Michel Masson, second edition. Dentu (Paris) 1833
- 1834: Deux Histoires à propos d'un livre, Michel Masson (Michel Raymond), edition : Roux (Paris) (In-8°, XXIII-370 p., fig.) 1834
- 1834: La paysanne demoiselle : vaudeville in 4 acts, Xavier Saintine, Michel Masson. First performance, Paris : in the Théâtre des Variétés, 13 March 1834, edition : Hautecoeur Martinet (Paris) 1834
- 1834: Le triolet bleu : comédie-vaudeville in 5 acts, Michel Masson and Ferdinand de Villeneuve. First performance, Paris : in the Théâtre du Palais-Royal, 15 May 1834
- 1834: Le mari de la favorite, comedy in 5 actes, Saintine and Michel Masson. First performance, Paris : Théâtre de la Porte Saint-Martin, 04-11-1834,
- 1834: La Paysanne Demoiselle, comédie en vaudevilles in 4 acts
- 1834: L'aiguillette bleue, historical comédie en vaudevilles in 3 acts. Michel Masson with Ernest Jaime, Achille d'Artois, First performance in Paris in the Théâtre des Variétes, 19 April 1834, edition: Marchant (Paris) (20 p.; gr. in-8) 1834
- 1834: Un Cœur de Jeune Fille, Confidence publiée par Michel Masson. (novel)
  - 1834: Bruxelles, Meline (VIII, 300 pages)
  - 1834: Paris, C. Allardin, (VIII-384 p. : pl.; In-8°)
  - 1845: Paris, Boule Et Cie, in: Les mille et un romans, nouvelles et feuilletons. tome 11

=== 1835-1839 ===
- 1835: Micheline, ou l'Heure de l'Esprit: opera-comique in 1 act, Saint-Hilaire, Masson and Devilleneuve; music by: M. Adolphe Adam, First performance in Paris in the Théâtre royal de l'Opéra-Comique, 29 June 1835, edition: Marchant (Paris) and A. Jouhaud (Brussels) (1 vol. (15 p.); Gr. in-8) 1835
- 1835: On ne passe pas ! ou, Le poste d'honneur, comédie en vaudevilles in 1 act
- 1836: Picciola, with Joseph Xavier Saintine with an introduction by Michel Masson.
- 1836: Le Diable amoureux, comédie en vaudevilles in 1 act
- 1836: Vierge et Martyre, Michel Masson, edition: Werdet (Paris) (2 vol. in-8°) 1836
- 1836: Madame Favart: vaudeville in 3 acts, mingled with song, Michel Masson and Saintine. First performance in Paris in the Théâtre du Palais-Royal, 26 December 1836, edition : Hautecoeur Martinet (Paris) 1836
- 1838: Les deux Pigeons, comédie en vaudevilles in 4 acts, imitated from La Fontaine, Masson et Saintine, First performance, Paris, in the Théâtre du Palais-Royal, 05-06-1838
- 1838: La levée des 300,000 hommes: comedie en vaudevilles in 1 act, Xavier [Boniface] and Michel Masson, First performance in the Théâtre du Palais-Royal, 27 November 1838, edition Marchant (Paris) (16 p.; gr. in-8) 1839
- 1838: Albertine, Michel Masson, edition: Werdet (Paris) (2 vol. in-16) 1838

=== 1840-1844 ===
- 1840: Les Trois Marie, Michel Masson et Jean-Baptiste-Pierre Lafitte. edition: Dumont (Paris) 1840–1841,
- 1840: Cocorico, ou La poule à ma tante, comédie en vaudevilles in 5 acts, Ferdinand de Villeneuve, Masson and Saint-Yves (É. Déaddé) First performance in the Théâtre du Palais Royal, 18 June 1840, edition: Marchant (Paris)
- 1840: Les Contes de l'Atelier, contains 4 stories from Daniel de Lapidaire ou les Contes de l'Atelier (1831/1832): L'Inévitable, L'Enseigne, Le Grain de Sable, Une Mère
  - 1840: Nouvelle édition revue et corrigée, (2 vols, 477, 422p, in-18), edition: C. Gosselin (Paris),
  - 1862: edition: Librairie De l. Hachette et Co. Paris
  - 1883: edition impr. de Charaire et fils (Sceaux) (544 p.: fig.; in-4)
- 1841: Basile, Michel Masson. edition : Dumont (Paris) (2 vol. in-8°) 1841
  - 1845: edition: Boulé (Paris) (1 vol. (168 p.); in-8) Les mille et un romans. t. 8
- 1842: Un amour perdu, Michel Masson, (2 vol. in-8°) edition: H. Souverain (Paris) 1842
- 1842: Les Enfants célèbres, ou Histoire des enfants de tous les siècles et de tous les pays, qui se sont immortalisés par le malheur, la piété, le courage, le génie, le savoir, et les talents, Michel Masson, third edition 1842, Edition: Librairie d'éducation de Didier, Paris 1842
- 1842: Les chanteurs ambulants, comédie en vaudevilles in 3 acts, Michel Masson and L. Bourdereau, first performance at the Théâtre des Follies Dramatique, 20 October 1842, edition: Marchant (Paris) 1842
- 1843: L'honneur du marchand, Michel Masson, edition: Comptoir des imprimeurs-unis (Paris) (2 vol.; in-8) 1843
- 1843: Un Secret de famille, drama-vaudeville in 3 acts
- 1844: Souvenirs d'un enfant du peuple, Michel Masson, 2 editions: Dolin, Librairie Commissionaire (Paris)
  - (1 vol. (342 p.); in-8 ) 1844
  - (8 vol.; in-8 ) 1844

=== 1845-1849 ===
- 1845: La Jeune régente, Frédéric Thomas and Michel Masson, 3 vol. in-8°, edition A. Recoules (Paris) 1845
- 1845: Le Télégraphe d'amour, comédie en vaudevilles in 3 acts, with F.Thomas
- 1846: Jean Baptiste, ou Un Cœur d'or, drama in 5 acts, mingled with songs, First performance on 28 March 1846 in Paris at the théâtre de la Gaite, F. de Villeneuve, Michel Masson, Frédéric Thomas, edition: Marchant, Paris, 1845
- 1846: La Fée au bord de l'eau, comedie en vaudevilles in 3 acts, Michel Masson and Frédéric Thomas, First performance, Paris, in the Théâtre des Folies dramatiques, 25-06-1846, edition : (1 impr. photoméc. : n. et b.; 26 x 17 cm. ) 1846
- 1846-1847: Le Capitaine des trois couronnes, Michel Masson. edition: G. Roux et Cassanet (Paris), (4 vol. in-8°) 1846–1847,
- 1847: Les incendiaires, Michel Masson, edition: Passard, Roux et Cassanet (Paris) (4 vol.; in-8 ) 1847
- 1847: La croisée de Berthe: comédie en vaudevilles in one act, Michel Masson and Jules-Édouard Alboise de Pujol (1805-1854), First performance in the Théâtre du Gymnase-Dramatique, 13 September 1847, edition : Beck (Paris) (16 p.; gr. in-8 ) 1847
- 1847: Didier l'honnête homme, comédie en vaudevilles in 2 acts, E. Scribe and Michel Masson, first performance in Paris in the Théâtre de Gymnase-Dramatique, 19 November 1847, Edition: Lelong, Bruxelles 1847
- 1848: Marceau, ou Les enfants de la République: drama in 5 acts and 10 scenes, by MM. Anicet Bourgeois and Michel Masson, first performance at the Théâtre de la Gaité, 22 June 1848, edition: Michel Lévy frères (Paris) (24 p. : fig.; In-fol.) 1868
- 1848: Christophe le cordier, comédie en vaudevilles in two acte, by Xavier & Michel Masson, first performance in Paris in the Théâtre de Gymnase, 6 February 1848, Edition Lelong, Brussels 1848
- 1849: Les Orphelins au Pont Notre-Dame, with Auguste Anicet-Bourgeois
- 1849: Les Quatre fils Aymon, légende fantastique in 5 acts, with Bourgeois
- 1849: La Saint-Sylvestre, opera-comique in 3 acts, Mélesville (pseud. of Anne Honoré Joseph Duveyrier) and Michel Masson, music by M. F. Basin, first performance in Paris at the Théâtre national de l'Opéra-Comique 7 July 1849, edition: J.A.Lelong, Bruxelles, 1849
- 1849: Piquillo alliaga ou Trois chateaux en Espagne ou trois chateaux en Espagne, drama in five acts and eleven tableaux, From the novel by M. Scribe, by M. Bourgeois and Michel Masson. First performance in Paris, at Théâtre de l'Ambigu-Comique, 2 October 1849, Edition Lelong, Brussels, 1849

=== 1850-1854 ===
- 1850: Une idée fixe ou Les amours du grand monde : comédie en vaudevilles in 2 acts, with: Auguste Lefranc; first performance in Paris 11 April 1850, edition: Poissy, Arbieu
- 1850: Héloise et Abailard ou A quelque chose, malheur est bon, comédie en vaudevilles in 2 acts, with: Scribe, First performance in Paris, Théâtre du Gymnase, 22 April 1850,
- 1850: Marianne, drama in 7 acts, including a prologue in 2 parts, with: Bourgeois
- 1851: Marthe et Marie : drame en six actes, dont un prologue, with: A. Bourgeois, First performance on 4 October 1851, in the Théâtre de l'Ambigu-Comique, Brussels, edition: Lelong,
- 1851: Une femme qui se grise: one-act comédie en vaudevilles. Livr. 171 / with: Anicet-Bourgeois; by MM. Guénée, Delacour and Lambert Thiboust, édition: Michel Lévy frères (Paris) 1851
- 1852: La dame de la halle: drama in 7 acts, and 1 prologue, with: Anicet Bourgeois, edition: Michel Lévy frères, Paris (125 p. in-18) 1852
- 1852: La mendiante, drama in 5 acts, with: M. Bourgeois, music by M. Mangeant, first performance in the Théâtre de la Gaité in Paris, 22 April 1852, edition: J.A.Lelong, Bruxelles, 1852
- 1853: La Tonelli, opéra comique in 2 acts, with Ambroise Thomas
- 1853: Marie-Rose : drama in 5 acts. [followed by] L'ambigu en habit neuf: prologue d'ouverture, en vers. Livr. 129, with: Anicet-Bourgeois; M. Ferdinand Dugué, first performance in the Théâtre de la Gaité, 4 April 1853, edition: Michel Lévy frères (Paris) (without date)
- 1853: Georges et Marie, drama in 5 acts. First performance in the Théâtre de la Gaite, 8 October 1853, edition: Michel Lévy frères (Paris) (26-6 p. : fig.; 31 cm) 1853
- 1853: Sous un bec de gaz: scenes de la vie nocturne en une nuit. Livr. 168, with: Anicet Bourgeois, Ch. Cabot, A. de Jallais et Lelarge; airs nouveaux by M. J. Nargeot, edition: Michel Lévy frères (Paris) (26-6 p. : fig.; 31 cm) 1853

=== 1854-1859 ===
- 1855: Bonaparte à l'École de Brienne: play in 3 acts and 4 tableaux, J. Gabriel [de Lurieu], de Villeneuve and Masson, First performance Théâtre de la Gaité, in Paris, 29 August 1855, edition: Tresse (Paris) (16 p.; gr. in-8) 1855
- 1855: Aimer et mourir, 3-act play, Michel Masson, First performance at Théâtre du Vaudeville in Paris, 11 September 1855, edition: Michel Lévy frères (Paris) 1855
- 1856: L'Oiseau de paradis, féerie play

=== 1860-1883 ===
- 1862: Une couronne d'épines, Michel Masson, edition :L. Hachette (Paris) (in-16, III-284 p. ) 1862,
- 1862: La Gerbée, contes à lire en famille, Michel Masson, edition E. Dentu, Paris, (In-16, VI-296 p., fig.)
- 1864: Second série des Contes de l'atelier: La Voix du sang. La Maitrise. La proie d'une ombre, Anna l'hébétée, La Complainte. par Michel MASSON. edition: L. Hachette, Paris, "Bibliothèque des chemins de fer", (in-16, br. edit., pp. (4), 368 (8).) 1864.
- 1865: La Femme du réfractaire, first edition of this novel in: 1832: Daniel le Lapidaire ou les Contes de l'Atelier
- 1866: Les Drames de la conscience, Michel Masson, edition: Librairie de l. Hachette et Cie, Paris, 1866. (8º. 294 pages)
- 1868: Les Lectures en famille, simples récits du foyer domestique
- 1870: Les Gardiennes
- 1873: Les Historiettes du père Broussailles
- 1873: Les Fils aînés de la République, drama in 5 acts and 9 tableaux, with Raoul de Navery, mise en scène by Henri Laurençon
- 1874: Le Dévouement, Masson Michel, Edition: Librairie Hachette, Paris, 1874, (8°. (8), IV, 278) 14 wood gravures v. Paul Philippoteaux.
  - second edition: Librairie Hachette, Paris, (8°. (8), IV, 298) 14 gravures 1877

== Bibliography ==
- Joseph Marie Quérard, Les supercheries littéraires dévoilées, vol. 3, 1850, p. 206
- Joseph Marie Quérard, Félix Bourquelot, Charles Louandre, La littérature française contemporaine. XIXe, 1854, p. 322
- Louis Gustave Vapereau, Dictionnaire universel des contemporains, 1861, p. 1182-1183
- Edmond-Denis De Manne, Louis Charles J. de Manne, Nouveau dictionnaire des ouvrages anonymes et pseudonymes, 1868, p. 379
- P. Larousse, Dictionnaire du XIX Siècle, tome 10, L-MEM, 1873,
- Ambroise Tardieu, Dictionnaire iconographique des Parisiens, 1885
- G. Garollo, Dizionario biografico universale, 1907
- Jean-Pierre Galvan, Correspondance générale d'Eugène Sue, vol.1, 2010, p. 89
