= Edmond de Biéville =

French journalist and playwright (1814–1880)

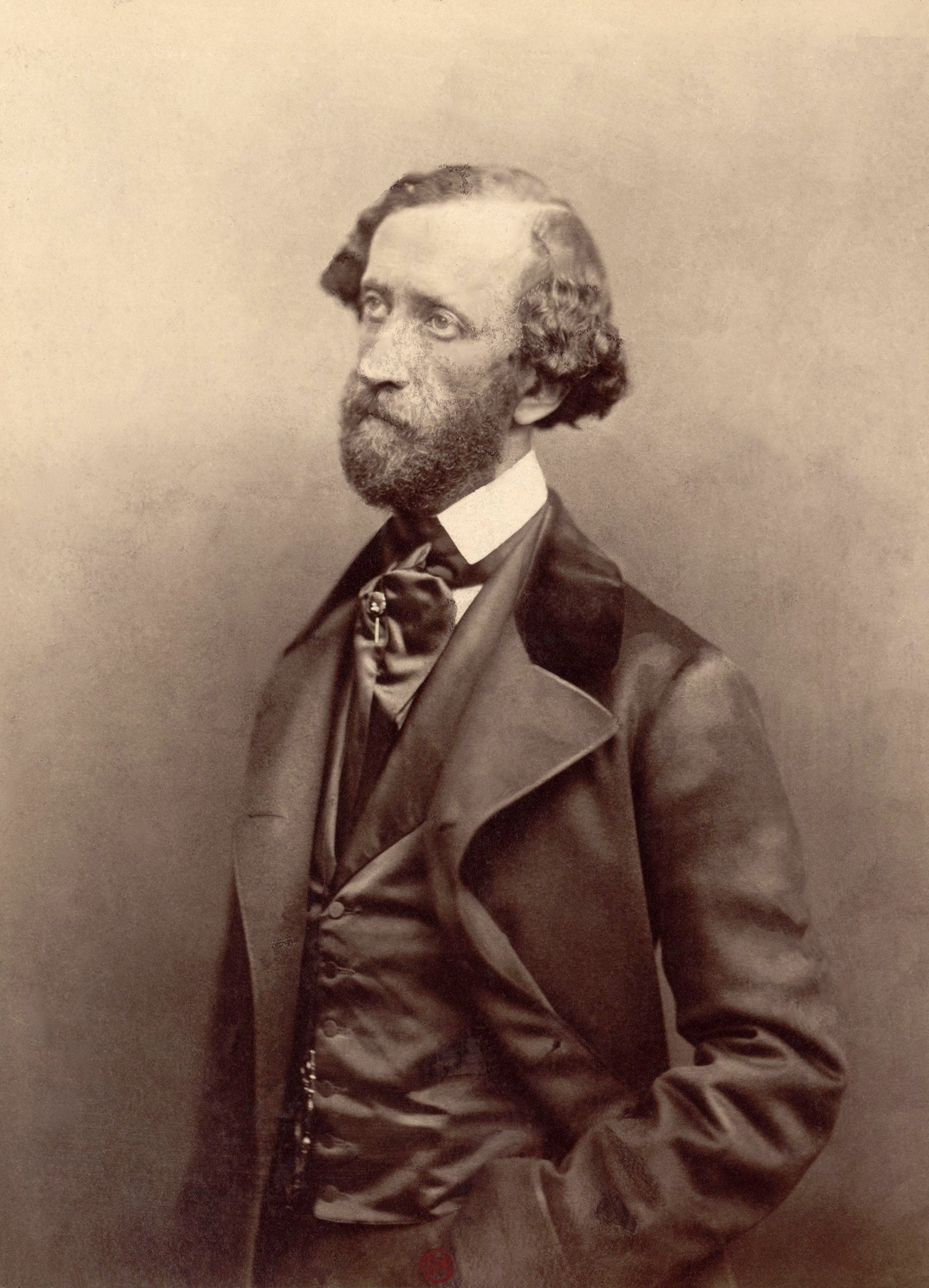
- Edmond de Biéville.
- Born: Charles-Henri-Étienne-Edmond Desnoyers de Biéville; 30 May 1814; Former 2nd arrondissement of Paris
- Died: 1 January 1880 (aged 65); 10th arrondissement of Paris
- Occupations: Journalist, playwright

Edmond de Biéville, full name Charles-Henri-Étienne-Edmond Desnoyers de Biéville, (30 May 1814 – 1 January 1880) was a French journalist and playwright.

The poet Fernand Desnoyers (1826-1869) was his brother.

A student at the École spéciale militaire de Saint-Cyr in 1832, he made his debut in the vaudeville under the pseudonyme Edmond de Biéville.

He was responsible for writing the theatrical reports for the newspaper Le Siècle from 1856 until his death.

== Works ==
=== Theatre ===
- 1836: L'Homéopathie, comédie en vaudevilles in 1 act by Biéville and Narcisse Fournier, Gymnase-Dramatique (13 October)
- 1837: Sans nom ! ou Drames et Romans, mystère-folie-vaudeville in 1 act by Biéville and Théaulon, Gymnase-Dramatique (22 July)
- 1837: De l'or ! ou le Rêve d'un savant, comédy in 1 act mixed with distincts by Biéville and Bayard, Gymnase-Dramatique (11 November)
- 1839: Geneviève la blonde, comédie en vaudevilles in two acts by Biéville and Bayard, théâtre des Variétés (22 May)
- 1840: Les Enfants de troupe, comedy in 2 acts mixed with songs, by Biéville and Bayard, Gymnase-dramatique (16 January)
- 1842: Talma en congé, vaudeville in 1 act by Biéville and Charles Redier, Gymnase-Dramatique (31 July)
- 1844: Au bord de l'abîme, ou Un roman à la mode, comédie en vaudevilles in 1 act by Biéville and Fournier, Gymnase-Dramatique (15 November)
- 1845: La Contrebasse, vaudeville in 1 act by Biéville, Théâtre du Palais-Royal (1 July)
- 1845: Les Couleurs de Marguerite, comédie en vaudevilles in 2 acts by Biéville and Bayard, Gymnase-Dramatique (4 October)
- 1847: La Sirène du Luxembourg, ou l'Amour et la Police, comédie en vaudevilles in 2 acts by Biéville and ***, Variétés (30 July)
- 1848: La Femme blasée, comédie en vaudevilles by Biéville and Fournier, Gymnase-Dramatique (8 March)
- 1848: Éric ou le Fantôme, drama in 3 acts by Biéville and Fournier, Théâtre de la Gaité (23 May)
- 1849: L'Année prochaine, ou Qui vivra verra, comédie en vaudevilles in 1 act by Biéville and Bayard, Gymnase-Dramatique (28 December)
- 1852: Los dansores espagnolas, jocosa toquadillas in 1 act by Biéville and Bayard, Palais-Royal (3 February)
- 1852: Une poule mouillée, vaudeville in 1 act by Biéville and Bayard, Palais-Royal (9 November)
- 1852: Le Fils de famille, comédie en vaudevilles in 3 acts by Biéville and Bayard, Gymnase-Dramatique (25 November)
- 1856: Les Fanfarons du vice, comedy in 3 acts by Biéville and Dumanoir, Gymnase-Dramatique (6 June)

== Bibliography ==
- Louis Gustave Vapereau, "Charles-Henri-Étienne-Edmond Desnoyers de Biéville", Dictionnaire universel des contemporains, 1880 (5e éd.), p. 217, at Gallica
