= Henri Fénée =

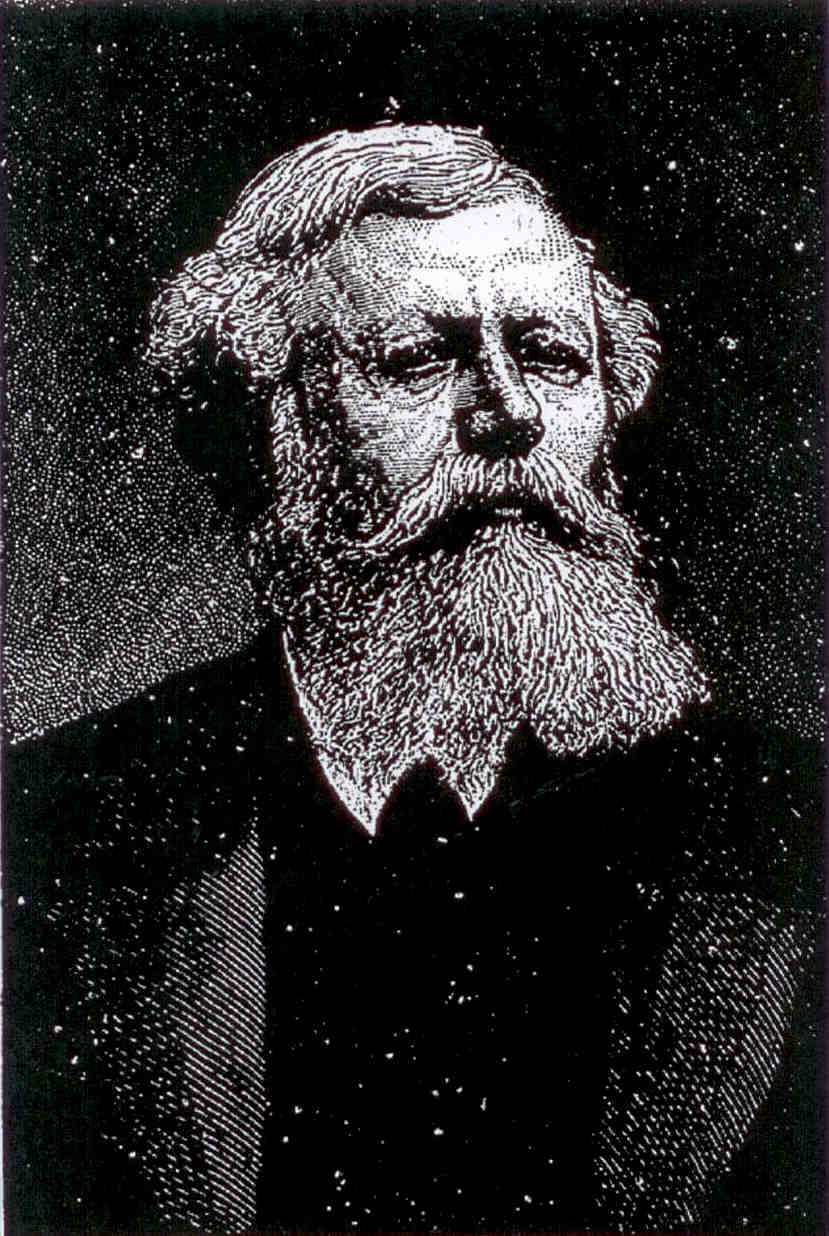
- Born: Henry Joseph Fené; 15 July 1820; 5th, Paris
- Died: 20 June 1882 (aged 61); 6th, Paris
- Occupations: Chansonnier; Goguetier

Henry Joseph Fené called Henri Fénée (15 July 1820 – 20 June 1882) was a 19th-century French poet, chansonnier and goguettier.

== Biography ==
First an engraver, at 20, he joined the service. He left the army with the rank of sergeant and entered as an employee in a branch of the Mont-de-piété, precisely in the house where he was born, rue Saint-Séverin.

He was a passionate collector of songs. Patient as a Benedictine to copy songs and other unpublished poems, he wrote countless couplets of his own. It was by copying that he began to compose for his own account.

Introduced to the Caveau by Jules Lagarde, an honorary member of this lyrical Society, he sang there couplets entitled L'Amateur de Chansons, which attracted on him the attention of the listeners, and were greeted with unanimous applause. Some months later, in July 1873 he was received an associate member of the Caveau, and from that moment regularly participated in its monthly banquets where he had his songs heard.

The magazine La Chanson, which appeared from 1878 to 1881, reported about these banquets, and published a certain number of these songs.

After he became office manager, Fénée retired in 1881. He lived at the time in Paris at 13 rue Mayet in the 6th arrondissement.

That same year, he published a large collection of his songs: Loisirs lyriques d'un amateur de chansons, highlighting this quote from Nicolas Brazier, another member of the Caveau :

Through songs, my mother lulled me, I want to finish as I began

The foreword by Eugène Grangé gives the biography of Fénée.

Also in 1881, a songbook of goguettier Charles Vincent mentioned him among the regulars of the goguette Pot-au-Feu.

His name and his work are now forgotten by the general public.

== Fénée's work as seen by Eugène Grangé ==
The genre of which Fénée was fond was the light and gaudriolesque one. One must not expect to find in his compositions the philosophy and poetry of Béranger. On the opposite, his inspiration was that of Michel-Jean Sedaine, Charles Collé and Marc-Antoine-Madeleine Désaugiers.

His songs which have achieved the most success include Faudra que j' vous l'amène un soir, — Ça fait bien dans le Paysage, — N' y a que le premier Pas qui coûte, — Mon Petit Bonhomme de chemin, — Ousqu' est ma Mitrailleuse ? — Allez-donc vous asseoir, — l'Épicurien reconnaissant, — C'est toujours la même Ficelle, — la Bergère, and many others. Finally a medley of Fanchon la Vielleuse which is a small masterpiece of Gallic gaiety.

== Sources ==
- Loisirs lyriques d'un amateur de chansons / par Henri Fénée,... ; et avant-propos par Eugène Grangé on Isidore Paris 1881.

== Works ==
- Loisirs lyriques d'un amateur de chansons, recueil de chansons d'Henri Fénée, avant-propos d'Eugène Grangé, chez Mme. Veuve Édouard Vert Imprimeur-Éditeur, Paris 1881, In-18, 352 pages, portrait.
