= Bal du Rat mort =

Annual Belgian masquerade ball

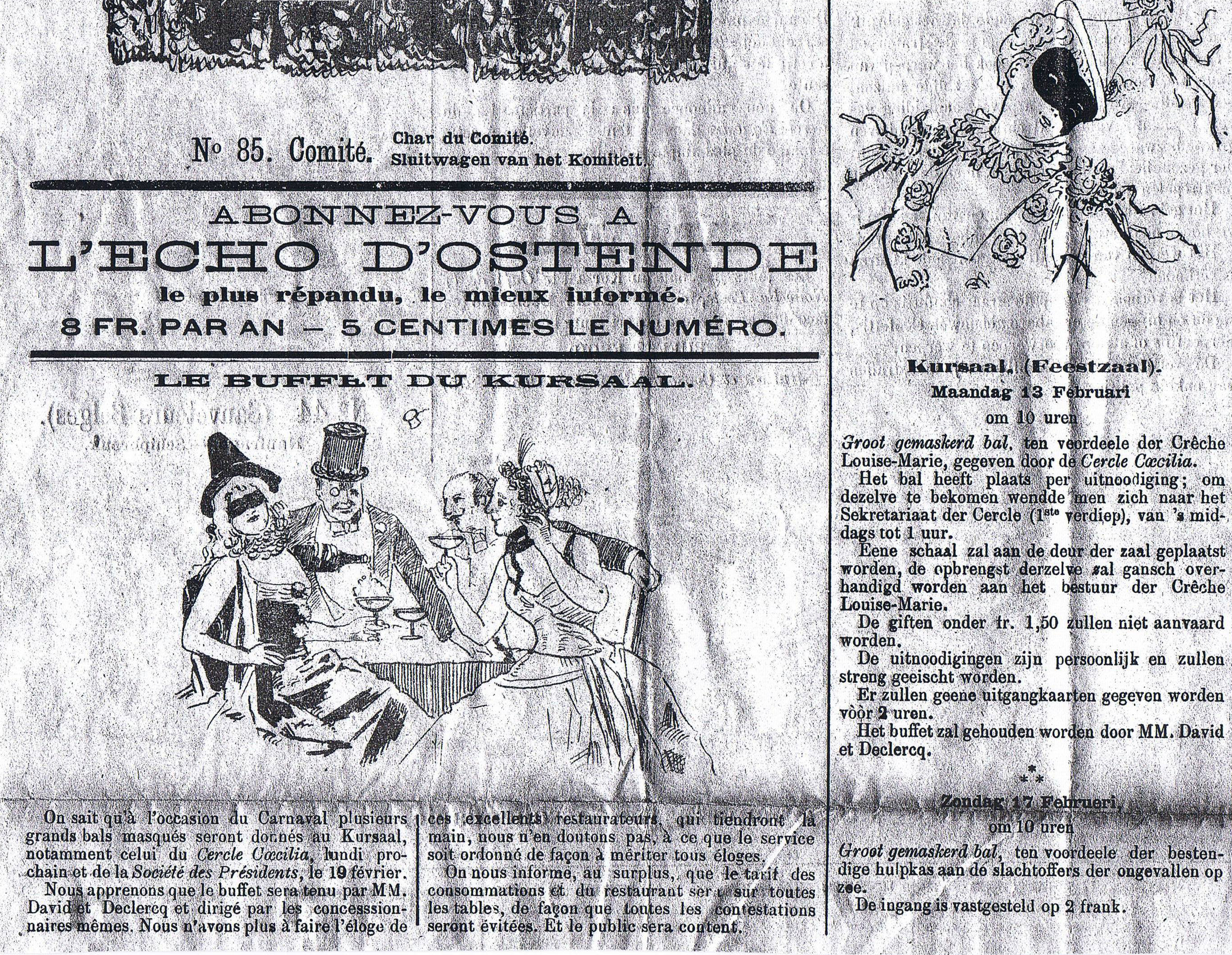
Announcement of the first Bal du Rat mort in 1898

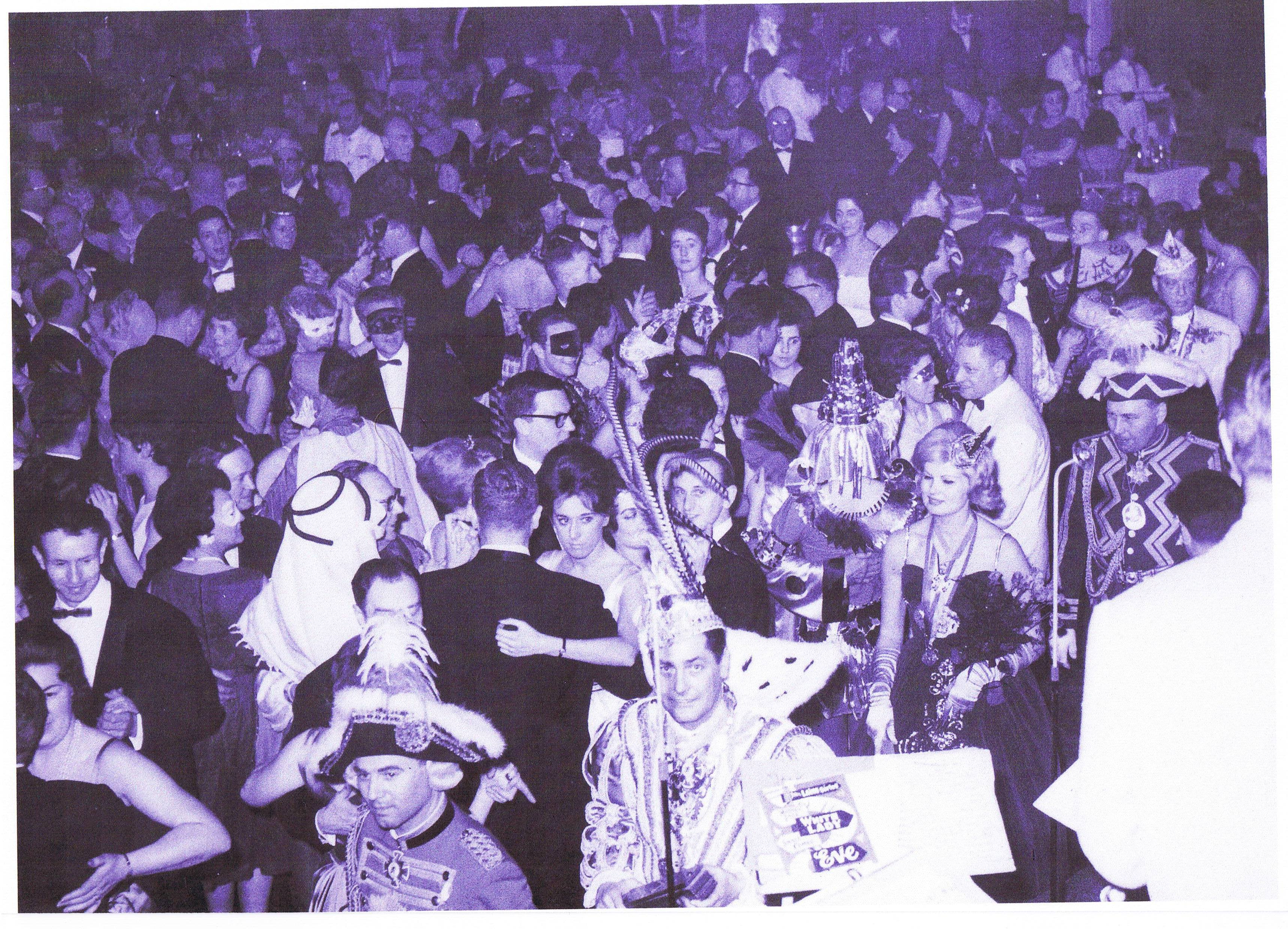
The Bal du Rat mort, 1968

The Bal du Rat mort ("Ball of the Dead Rat") is an annual masquerade ball held in Ostend, Belgium in the Kursaal, Ostend casino. The event was first held in 1898.

== History ==
In 1898, a group of members of the Cercle Cœcilia from Ostend travelled to Paris. Joined by Anglo-Belgian painter James Ensor they visited Montmartre night-spots such as the Moulin Rouge and a small venue known as "Le Rat Mort". On their return to Belgium, they decided to host a ball named in its honour.

== Costume themes ==
Recent Bal du Rat mort costume themes include

- 2009: "Arabian Nights"
- 2010: "Out of Africa"
- 2011: "Land of the Rising Sun"
- 2012: "French cancan"
