= Raymond Brucker =

French writer

Raymond Brucker (5 May 1800, Paris – 28 February 1875, Paris), full name Raymond Philippe Auguste Brucker, was a 19th-century French writer.

A fan-worker then an essayist and homme de lettres, he converted to Catholicism in 1839. He was professor of philosophy. He wrote under various pseudonyms (Paul Séverin, Aloysius Block, Champercier, Duvernay, Ch. Dupuy, Olibrius), and in collaboration with Michel Masson (1800–1883) and with Léon Gozlan under the pseudonym Michel Raymond.

== Works ==
under the pseudonym Raymond Brucker

- 1833: Les cent-et-une nouvelles nouvelles des Cent-et-un, ornées de cent-et-une vignettes, recueil de nouvelles en 2 volumes, Paris, Ladvocat
- 1833: Le livre des conteurs, with other authors, Paris, Allardin
- 1837: Mensonge, roman 2 vol., Paris, Werdet
- 1840: Branches d'olivier. Recueil de poésies chrétiennes, with other authors, Paris, Olivier Fulgence
- 1844: Les Docteurs du jour devant la famille, Paris, Sagnier et Bray
- 1848: Profession de foi d'un citoyen de Paris pour sa candidature à l'Assemblée nationale, Paris, Guiraudet et Jouaust
- 1848: Testament d'Alibaud. Contrat d'alliance entre les socialistes et les républicains, Paris, Schneider
- 1853: Le Carême du roi, comedy in three acts, Paris, De Soye et Bouchet
- 1854: Quarante-huit heures de la vie de ma mère, Paris, De Soye et Bouchet

under the pseudonym Michel Raymond

- 1829: Le Maçon, moeurs populaires, roman in 4 vol., with Michel Masson, Paris, Ambroise Dupont et Cie, (4 vol. in-12)

This book was received with great praise of the critics. It was written in cooperation with Michel Masson. The pseudonym used was the conjunction of the first names of the men.

- 1832: Le Puritain de Seine-et-Marne, Paris, H. Dupuy, (375 p., front.; in-8°)
- 1832–33: Daniel le lapidaire, ou les Contes de l'atelier, Bruxelles, J.-P. Méline, This book is all written by Michel Masson.

Michel Masson used this very pseudonym once more for the first two volumes of his book: Contes de l'atelier ou Daniel le Lapidaire. (1832–1833 (4 vol. in-8). After the success of these two parts, he used his own name for vol 3 & 4.

- 1833: Les Sept péchés capitaux, novel (2 vol.) Paris, Werdet

Brucker also worked with Léon Gozlan, on a novel entitled Les Intimes. It was published in 1834 under the same pseudonym "Michel Raymond", in an attempt to ride on the success of this name. Although he never protested, after this, Michel Masson stopped all cooperation with Raymond Brucker.

- 1834: Les Intimes, novel (3 vol.), with Léon Gozlan, Paris, Eugène Renduel,
  - 1834: third edition:
- 1835: Un secret, novel (2 vol.), Paris, Allardin
- 1838: Le Boudoir et la mansarde, novel (2 vol.), with Carle Ledhuy, Paris, C. Lachapelle
- 1839: Le Portefeuille de maroquin noir, novel (2 vol.), with Léon Gozlan, Paris, J. Laisné
  - edition 1861: signed with Léon Gozlan, edition: Paris, Dentu, (collection Hetzel), (Pt. in-8°, 316 pages)
- 1839: Loi de liberté. Epitre à Raspail, Paris, Librairie Sociale
- 1840: Henriette, novel (2 vol. in-8), Paris, Werdet et Cie,
- 1841: Scandale, (2 vol.), Paris, Paris, Werdet
- 1841: Maria, roman inédit, (2 vol.), Paris, C. Le Clère
- 1842: Les Causeries de Bruyères-le-Châtel, Paris, Werdet
- 1842: Un Jacobin sous la Régence, Paris, Werdet

under the pseudonym Paul Séverin

- 1838: Le Bouquet de mariage, révélations sur les mœurs du siècle, (2 vol.), Paris, Gosselin et Coquebert
