= Auguste Chabaud =

French painter and sculptor

- Born: Auguste Elysée Chabaud; 3 October 1882; Nîmes
- Died: 23 May 1955 (aged 72); Graveson
- Citizenship: French
- Education: Académie Julian
- Occupations: Painter, sculptor
- Organization: Escolo de Lar
- Movement: Cubism
- Spouse: Valentine Chabaud

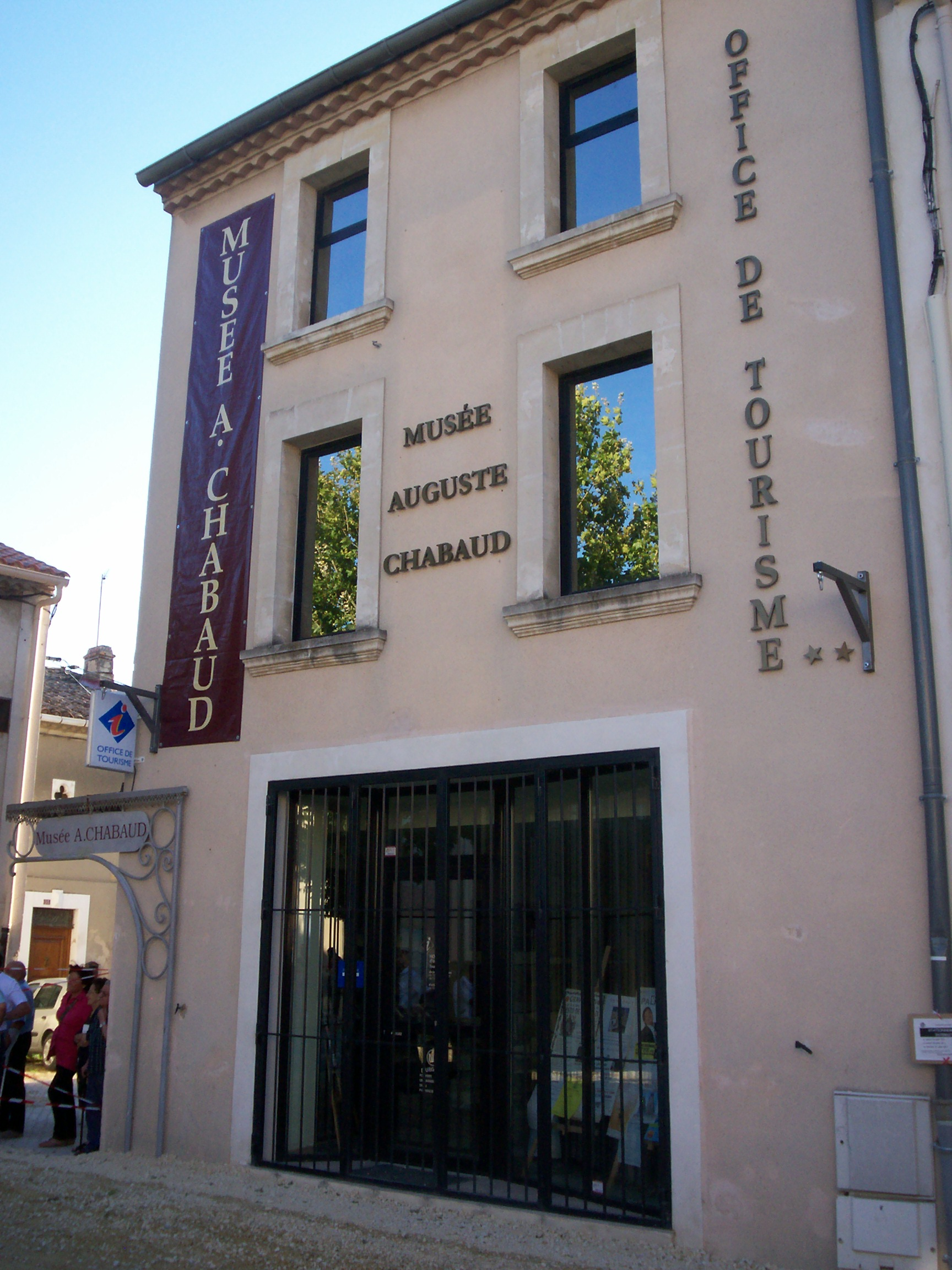
Musée Auguste Chabaud at Graveson (2011)

Auguste Chabaud (3 October 1882 – 23 May 1955) was a French painter and sculptor.

== Biography ==
He was born in Nimes. At the age of fourteen Chabaud joined the Ecole des Beaux-Arts in Avignon. In 1899 he went to Paris to continue his artistic training at the Academie Julian and the Ecole des Beaux Arts. There he met Henri Matisse and André Derain. In 1900 he returned to his parents' vineyard in southern France, because the business was affected by a crisis there.

In 1901, he was forced to leave Paris again in order to secure his livelihood. He worked on a ship and got to know the West African coast. In the following years he became acquainted with the Parisian nightlife. In the Paris neighborhood Montmartre, where he had his studio, he painted various scenes of Parisian life.

Chabaud's Cubist phase began in 1911, where he also began sculpting. In the following years he had many exhibitions, including 1913 in New York, where his works were exhibited alongside those of artists such as Matisse, Derain, Vlaminck and Picasso.

After his return from the first World War Chabaud settled down in Graveson. From 1920 he had his "blue period". He used the Prussian Blue as the only color in his works. From then, he focused exclusively on the south of France. He painted scenes of rural life, the farmers, and the hills and trails of the Alpilles. He died in 1955 in Graveson.

In 1992, the Regional Council of Provence-Alpes-Côte d'Azur opened the Musée Auguste Chabaud in his honor.
