= Léon Gozlan =

French novelist and playwright (1803–1866)

- Léon Gozlan by Nadar
- Born: 11 September 1803; Marseille
- Died: 14 September 1866 (aged 63); Paris
- Occupations: Novelist; Playwright

Léon Gozlan (11 September 1803 – 14 September 1866) was a 19th-century French novelist and playwright.

== Life ==
When he was still a boy, his father, who had made a large fortune as a ship-broker, met with a series of misfortunes, and Léon, before completing his education, had to go to sea in order to earn a living. In 1828 we find him in Paris, determined to run the risks of literary life. His townsman, Joseph Méry, who was then making himself famous by his political satires, introduced him to several newspapers, and Gozlan's brilliant articles in Le Figaro did much harm to the already tottering government of Charles X.

He was made a member of the Legion of Honour in 1846, and in 1859 an officer of that order. He died on 14 September 1866 in Paris, and was buried at Montmartre Cemetery

== Works ==
His first published works were:

- 1820: les Émotions de Polydore Marasquin, edition : H. Laurens (Paris) (160 p.-4 f. de pl. en coul. : ill. ; in-16)
  - (undated) edition: F. Rouff (Paris) (32 p. : couv. ill. en coul. ; gr. in-8)
- 1825: Plus joyeuses aventures d'Aristide Froissard, edition : F. Rouff (Paris) (48 pages)

His first novel was:

- 1828: Mémoires d'un apothicaire sur la Guerre d'Espagne, pendant les années 1808 à 1814, with: Sébastien Blaze(1785-184.), edition: Ladvocat (Paris)(2 vol. 447, 400 p.; 22 cm),'

This novel was followed by many others, including:

- 1834: Les Intimes, (3 vol.), published under the pseudonym "Michel Raymond", with Raymond Brucker, Paris, Eugène Renduel,

Michel Raymond, was a pseudonym, first used for a book written by Michel Masson and Raymond Brucker: Le Maçon, mœurs populaires, (4 vol.) This book was received with great praise of the critics. The pseudonym used was the conjunction of the first names of these two men. In cooperation with Léon Gozlan Raymond Brucker wrote the novel Les Intimes. It was published in 1834 under the same pseudonym "Michel Raymond", in an attempt to ride on the success of this name. Although he never protested, after this Michel Masson stopped all cooperation with Raymond Brucker.

- 1836: Le Notaire de Chantilly, edition : Dumont (Paris) (2 vol. in-8°)
- 1838: Washington Levers et Socrate Leblanc
- 1839: Les Tourelles, Histoire des châteaux de France, edition: Dumont (Paris) (2 vol. (358, 348 p.); in-8)
  - 1858: (new edition), edition: Michel Lévy frères (Paris) (1 vol. 349 p.; in-18)
- 1839: Les tourelles, Histoire des châteaux de France, edition: Dumont (Paris) (2 vol. (358, 348 p.) ; in-8)
- 1843: Aristide Froissart, (one of the most curious and celebrated of his productions)
  - 1886: Aristide Froissart (Nouv. éd.), edition: Librairie illustrée (Paris) (410 p. ; in-8)
- 1845: Les Nuits du Père Lachaise, edition: A. Lemerle (Paris) (3 vol. in-8°)
  - 1890: new edition: Calmann-Lévy (Paris) (1 vol. (360 p.); in-16)
- 1852: De neuf heures à minuit, edition: Victor Lecou (Paris) (III-350 p. ; in-18)
- 1855: Le Tapis vert
- 1857: Le Folle du logis
  - 1859: Le Folle du logis, edition : Librairie nouvelle (Paris), (In-18, 317 p. )
- 1857: Les Emotions de Polydore Marasquin, edition: Librairie illustrée (Paris) (322 p.: ill., couv. ill.; in-16)
- 1859: La Comédie et les Comédiens, edition: Michel Lévy, Paris, 1859, third edition. (17x11 cm. IV+345 p)
- 1861: Le Faubourg mystérieux, Le Vampire du Val de Grâce, edition : E. Dentu (Paris) (In-18, 335 p.) (1861)

(translated by Brian Stableford as The Vampire Of The Val-de-Grâce in 2012; ISBN 978-1-61227-123-1)

- 1862: Histoire d'un diamant, edition: Michel-Lévy frères (Paris) (320 p., in-8)
- 1866: Le capitaine Maubert, edition: C. Vanier (Paris), (1 vol. (174 p.) ; in-18 ),
- 18??: Le dragon rouge,
  - edition 1876: Bureaux du "Siècle" (Paris) 1 vol. (numbered 265–345); in-4
- 18??: Aventures merveilleuses et touchantes du prince Chènevis et de sa jeune soeur ; woodcuts: Bertall,
  - edition 1880: J. Hetzel (Paris) (1 vol. (120 p.) : fig. ; in-16 )
- 1872: La Vivandière, edition: E. Dentu (Paris), (In-18, 315 p.)

His best-known works for the theatre are:

- 1848: Le Lion empaillé
- 1849: Une tempête dans un verre d’eau, first performance in Paris in the Théâtre historique, 18 décembre 1849
- 1850: La Queue du chien d'Alcibiade, comédie in 2 actes, First performance in the Théâtre-Français, (Paris) 29 May 1850, edition: Michel-Lévy fr. (Paris)(48 p.; In-12)
- 1850: Une Tempête dans un verre d'eau, two curtain-raisers which stayed long on the stage
- 1852: Les Paniers de la comtesse
- 1854: Louise de Nanteuil, pièce en cinq actes, First performance in the Théatre du Vaudevilles 14 Januaryj 1854, edition : Michel-Lévy frères (Paris)(22 p. : fig.; 31 cm)(1860)
- 1855: Le Gâteau des reines, comédie en 5 actes, en prose, first presentation in the theatre 31 August 1855, édition : Michel-Lévy frères (Paris) (In-18, 112 p. )
- 1857: La Famille Lambert, comédie en 2 actes, en prose, first performance: 28 April 1857, Theatre du Vaudeville (Paris)

edition: Michel-Lévy frères (Paris) (12 p.: fig.; 31 cm) 1858,

- 1861: La Pluie et le beau temps, comedie in 1 act, en proze, edition: Calmann Levy, Paris, (new edition, 1878) (28p, in.12)

He adapted several of his own novels to the stage. Gozlan also wrote a romantic and picturesque description of the old manors and mansions of his country entitled Les Châteaux de France (2 vols, 1844), originally published (1836) as Les Tourelles, which has some archaeological value, and a biographical essay on Balzac (Balzac chez lui, 1862).
