= Alfred Delvau =

French journalist (1825–1867)

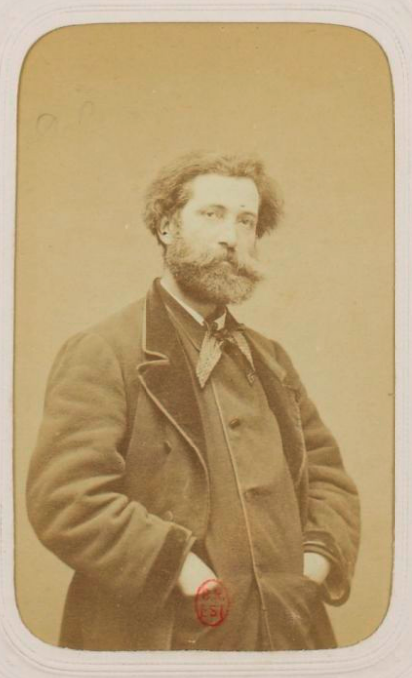
- Born: 1825; Paris
- Died: 1867 (aged 41–42)
- Writing career
- Language: French
- Genres: History, Culture, Language, Erotica

Alfred Delvau (1825 – May 3, 1867) was a French journalist and writer born in Paris.

== Biography ==
Alfred Delvau was the son of a master tanner from the Faubourg Saint-Marceau; he recounts his Parisian childhood in Au bord de la Bièvre : impressions and memories, published in 1854.

He began writing articles for La Réforme in 1846, for Le Triboulet in January 1848, and in the Journal pour Rire. He was the private secretary of Ledru-Rollin and, in 1848, founded L'Aimable faubourien. Diary of the rabble with Poulet-Malassis, his closest friend, and Antonio Watripon. The June 23, 1848, during the insurrections, the three had together came under fire at the barricades, atrue des Mathurins .

Delvau published a History of the February Revolution (1850) and collected The Revolutionary Walls (1851). During the interlude of the Second Republic, Delvau wrote twice to the Minister of the Interior asking for help. Under the Second Empire, he earned his living by participating, in lexicographic work. He already joined the team of Maurice Lachâtre's Universal Dictionary in 1854.

He contributed to Le Figaro . He produced a Green Language Dictionary and an Erotic Dictionary, which led to legal proceedings.

He is the author of works on Paris and its history. He is one of the authors of the pastiche Le Parnassiculet contemporain which mocks Parnassian poets .

== Writings ==
Delvau published widely on Parisian life, slang and literature, and several of his books were illustrated by prominent etchers. The following are among his principal works:

Year	Title	Notes
1845	Un mari au XVII^{e} siècle	"A Husband in the 17th Century"
1848	Grandeur et décadence des grisettes	"Grandeur and Decline of the Grisettes"; includes his own drawings, engraved by F. Leblanc
1848	Ledru-Rollin : sa vie politique	"Ledru-Rollin: His Political Life"
1848	La Présidence s'il vous plaît !	"The Presidency, If You Please!"; published as the work of an old-guard republican
1850	À bas le suffrage universel !	"Down with Universal Suffrage!"
1850	Histoire de la Révolution de Février	"History of the February Revolution"
1854	Au bord de la Bièvre	"On the Banks of the Bièvre"; subtitled Impressions et souvenirs; new edition in 1873 with a bibliography of his works
1859–1860	Bibliothèque bleue : romans de chevalerie	Medieval romances of chivalry (12th–16th centuries) issued in instalments and edited by Delvau; reissued in 1869 as Collection des romans de chevalerie mis en prose française moderne
1859	Bibliothèque franco-italienne	Series of four works: a life of Giuseppe Garibaldi (1807–1859), Le Petit Caporal des zouaves, Les Martyrs de l'Italie sous la domination autrichienne and Histoire populaire de la campagne d'Italie
1859	Les Chimères	"The Chimeras"
1859	Mémoires d'un vieux sou	"Memoirs of an Old Sou"; co-written with Pierre Bry
1860	Les Dessous de Paris	"The Underside of Paris"; frontispiece by Léopold Flameng; reissued by Éditions Lurlure in 2017
1860	Dictionnaire topographique, historique et étymologique des rues de Paris	Dictionary of Parisian street names, published within Le Nouveau Paris
1862	Histoire anecdotique des cafés et cabarets de Paris	"Anecdotal History of the Cafés and Cabarets of Paris"; illustrated with drawings and etchings by Gustave Courbet, Félicien Rops and Flameng
1862	Lettres de Junius	"Letters of Junius"; subtitled Coups de plume sincères sur la littérature contemporaine
1863	Les Amours buissonnières	"Truant Loves"; a Parisian novel
1864	Les Cythères parisiennes	"Parisian Cytheras"; anecdotal history of the dance halls of Paris, with 24 etchings and a frontispiece by Rops and Émile Thérond
1864	Dictionnaire érotique moderne	"Modern Erotic Dictionary"; frontispiece by Rops
1865	Gérard de Nerval, sa vie et ses œuvres	Study of Gérard de Nerval, with an etching by G. Staal
1865	Mémoires d'une honnête fille	"Memoirs of an Honest Girl"
1865	Françoise	Previously unpublished chapter of the history of the Four Sergeants of La Rochelle, with an etching by Thérond
1865	Histoire anecdotique des barrières de Paris	"Anecdotal History of the Gates of Paris"; ten etchings by Thérond
1865	Le Fumier d'Ennius	"Ennius's Dung Heap"; frontispiece by Flameng
1866	Dictionnaire de la langue verte	"Dictionary of the Green Language"; subtitled Argots parisiens comparés
1866	Le Grand et le petit trottoir	"The Big and the Little Pavement"; a Parisian novel
1866	Aucassin et Nicolette	Edition of the medieval romance Aucassin and Nicolette, with a translation by Delvau
1866	Les Heures parisiennes	"Parisian Hours"; 25 etchings by Émile Bénassit
1866	Henry Murger et la Bohême	Study of Henri Murger
1866	Du Pont des Arts au Pont de Kehl	"From the Pont des Arts to the Pont de Kehl"; subtitled Reisebilder d'un Parisien
1867	Les Lions du jour	"The Lions of the Day"; Parisian portraits, with etchings by Rops
1867	Les Plaisirs de Paris	"The Pleasures of Paris"; a practical illustrated guide
1867	Les Sonneurs de sonnets, 1540–1866	Study of the sonnet
1867	À la porte du paradis	Collection of short pieces, including Ma première leçon de boxe, Je me tuerai demain, Feu André-André and L'Héritier du mandarin
1884	Les Cocottes de mon grand-père	"My Grandfather's Cocottes"; posthumous
1894	Miss Fauvette	Posthumous
1903	Fouterie de poète	"Poet's Fornication"; posthumous

The volume Le Théâtre érotique français sous le Bas-Empire was published under Delvau's name in 1872 but is not his work. His name was added to the reprint because his books were then in fashion.
