= Joseph Patrat =

French actor and playwright (1733–1801

Joseph Patrat or Patras (7 May 1733, Arles – 4 June 1801, Paris) was a French actor and playwright.

== Life and career ==
The son of a stagehand, he began his stage career in Berlin in 1755 and then acted in the Austrian Netherlands from 1756 to 1763, notably in Brussels in the company of the Théâtre de la Monnaie. He then acted in Marseille and Geneva, where he also began to write plays.

A writer of forty plays, Patrat was also part of the company of Mademoiselle Montansier before establishing himself in Paris and writing several pieces for the Comédie-Française, the Théâtre des Variétés-Amusantes, the Théâtre Montansier, the Théâtre de l'Ambigu-Comique, and above all for the Comédie-Italienne, the Théâtre du Palais-Royal, the Théâtre Feydeau and the Odéon.

Patrat's play L'Heureuse Erreur was published in 1783, and was then translated into English and adapted by Elizabeth Inchbald in 1786. Her version is titled The Widow's Vow.

== See also ==
- List of French actors
- List of French writers
- List of playwrights
