= Raoul de Navery =

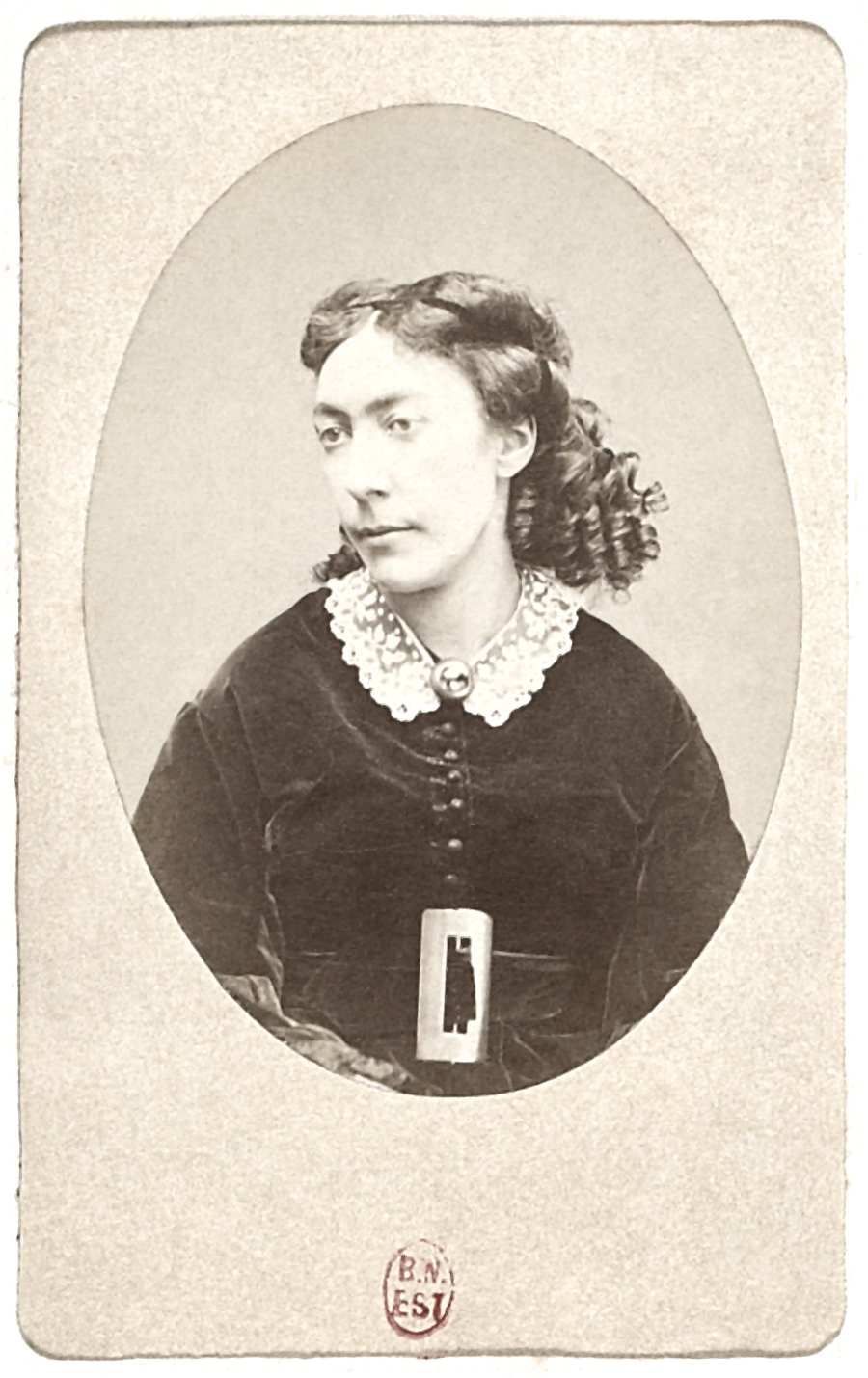
Eugénie Saffray, called Raoul de Navery, circa 1875

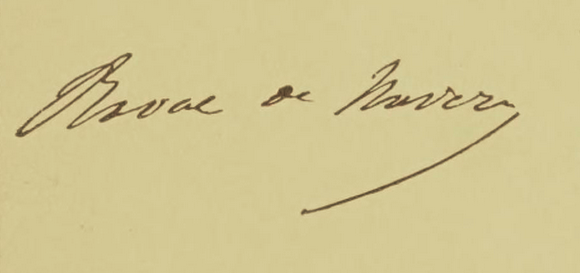
signature

Raoul de Navery was the pseudonym of Madame Chervet, born Marie-Eugenie Saffray (21 September 1829 in Ploërmel – 17 May 1885 in La Ferté-sous-Jouarre), a French Roman Catholic novelist. She also wrote under the pseudonyms Marie David and M. S. David.

== Works ==
(incomplete list. Source: Bibliothèque nationale de France

- Le Testament de Jésus, poème évangélique (1850) Texte en ligne
- Aux soldats de l'armée de Lyon (1855)
- Aux soldats de l'armée d'Orient, poésies (1855)
- Pour les inondés (1856) Texte en ligne
- Marguerites, poésies (1856)
- La Crèche et la croix, poésies (1856) Texte en ligne
- Souvenirs du pensionnat (1857) Texte en ligne
- Comédie, drames et proverbes (1858) Texte en ligne
- Peblo et Simplette (1858)
- Les Prismes (1858) Texte en ligne
- Deux Contes en vers. Les prismes, poésies (1858)
- Viatrice (1860)
- Les Nouvelles de charité (1860)
- L'Ange au bagne (1860)
- Monique (1860)
- Les Récits consolants (1860)
- Le Chemin du paradis (1861) Texte en ligne
- L'Abbé Marcel (1861)
- Avocats et paysans (1861)
- Aglaé (1862)
- La Cendrillon du village (1863)
- Mémoires d'une femme de chambre (1864) Texte en ligne
- Les Religieuses (1864) Texte en ligne
- Bonheur dans le mariage (1864)
- Le Rameur de galère (1865) Texte en ligne
- Jeanne-Marie (1865)
- Le Missionnaire de terre maudite (1866)
- La Femme d'après Saint-Jérôme (1866)
- Martyr d'un secret (1867)
- La Main qui se cache (1867)
- La Confession de la reine (1868)
- Saphir, la Ninivite (1869)
- Le Rameur de galères (1870)
- Le Château des Abymes (1871)
- Les Idoles (1874)
- Zacharie le maître d'école (1874)
- Patira (1875) Texte en ligne (réédition de 1884)
- La Fille du coupeur de paille, suivie d'autres nouvelles (1875)
- Les Drames de la misère (1875) Texte en ligne
- L'Odyssée d'Antoine (1875)
- Le Témoin du meurtre (1875) Texte en ligne
- Les Chevaliers de l'écritoire (1875)
- Le Capitaine aux mains rouges (1876) Texte en ligne
- Madeleine Miller, histoire alsacienne (1876)
- Le Pardon du moine (1876) Texte en ligne
- Les Parias de Paris (1876)
- Le Trésor de l'abbaye (1876) Texte en ligne
- Le Chemin du paradis (1877)
- La Route de l'abîme (1877)
- Le Cloître rouge (1877) Texte en ligne
- Jean Canada (1877)
- Le Marquis de Pontcallec (1878) Texte en ligne
- L'Aboyeuse (1878) Texte en ligne
- Voyage autour de soi-même (1878) Texte en ligne
- La Conscience (1878)
- Légendes de la vierge de marbre (1878) Texte en ligne
- Les Naufrageurs (1879) Texte en ligne
- La Demoiselle du paveur (1879)
- La Maison du sabbat (1879)
- Madame de Robur (1879)
- La Péruvienne (1879) Texte en ligne
- Cœurs vaillants. Nouvelles historiques (1879) Texte en ligne
- Le Gouffre (1879)
- L'Accusé (1879) Texte en ligne
- La Fille du roi Dagobert (1879) Texte en ligne
- Les Robinsons de Paris (1879) Texte en ligne
- La Main malheureuse (1880)
- Les Victimes (1880)
- Les Vautours du Bosphore (1880)
- Récits historiques : Gertrude de Wart. Le Duel de la veuve (1880)
- Les Voyages de Camoens (1880) Texte en ligne
- Les Aventures de Martin Tromp (1880)
- La Boîte de plomb (1881)
- Le Martyre d'un père (1881)
- Le Moulin des trépassés. Le Guet de Saint-Malo (1881)
- Le Naufrage de Lianor (1881)
- Le Magistrat (1882)
- Une erreur fatale (1882)
- Lory (1882)
- Les Mystères de Jumièges (1883)
- L'Élixir de longue vie (1883)
- Le Juif Éphraïm (1884)
- La Chambre No. 7 (1884)
- Les Mirages d'or (1884)
- Le Serment du corsaire (1884)
- Le Contumax (1885)
- Le Val-Perdu (1885
- Les Îles sauvages (1885)
- L’Évadé (1886)
- Les Enfants du bourgmestre (1888)
- La Conscience (1890) Texte en ligne
- Le Duel de la veuve (1891)
- Le Roman d'un honnête homme (1891)
- Les Dupes (1892)
- Landry (1895)
- La Fille sauvage (1902)
- La Tragique Épopée de Luiz de Camoëns, poète et gentilhomme portugais aux grandes Indes (1928)
