= Antonio Watripon =

French writer (1822–1864)

Antonio Watripon (1822–1864) was a French journalist, critic and Republican activist.

== Life ==
Antonio Watripon was born in Beauvais in 1822. In 1847, he founded the Lanterne du Quartier Latin. He and Alfred Delvau founded the Aimable faubourien, journal de la canaille in 1848. He wrote under several pseudonyms, including Jules Choux au Père Duchêne, Tony Fanfan, Anacharsis Croton-Duvivier and Joseph Devimes. He was the editor of Journal des Écoles, and a friend of Baudelaire.

== Works ==
- Histoire politique des écoles et des étudiants depuis le Moyen âge jusqu'à 1850: 1ère partie, 1815-1830, 1850.
- François Villon, 1857.
- Echos de jeunesse : les trois âges du pays latin, 1863.
