= Charles Vincent (playwright) =

French chansonnier, goguettier, publisher, writer (1828–1888)

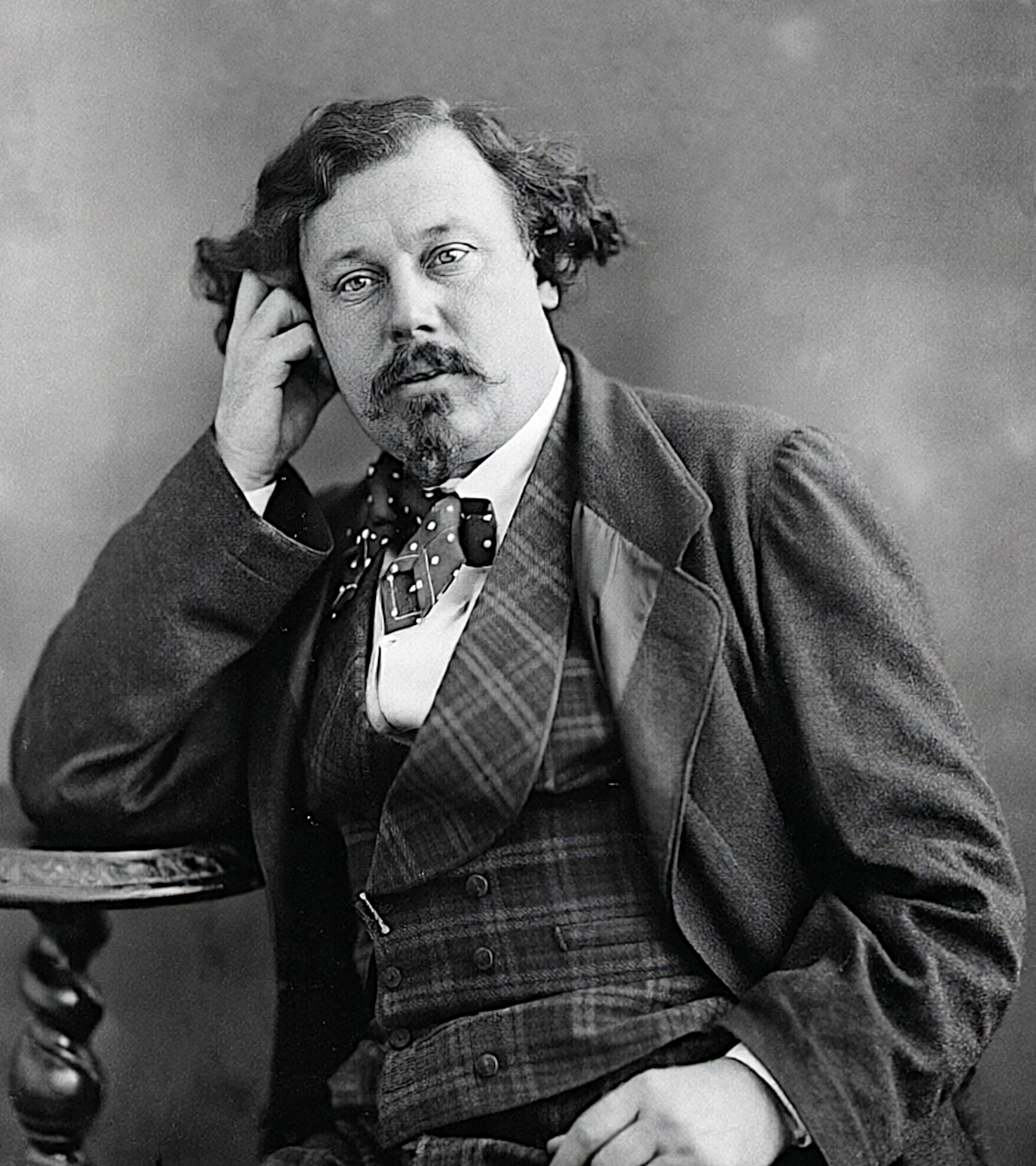
Charles Vincent by Nadar, restored

Charles Hubert Vincent (Fontainebleau, 15 April 1828 – 16 August 1888) was a French playwright, chansonnier, goguettier, novelist, journalist and publisher.

== Biography ==
Coming from a family of four generations of wig makers, he left the Graduate School of Fontainebleau at the age of thirteen and engaged in several little jobs. He was alternatively a notary and avoué clerk. In 1840, he moved to Paris as an upholsterer and then worked as traveling salesman.

During the French Revolution of 1848, Vincent attracted attention with his revolutionary poems, published in 1849 under the title Album révolutionnaire. Chants démocratiques.

In 1850, he settled in Paris, and from singing to political meetings, he naturally came to journalism and songwriting. Charles Vincent became famous.

Vincent wrote many novels, poems and songs, including the collection titled Refrains du dimanche (Paris, 1856), composed in collaboration with Édouard Plouvier and illustrated by Gustave Doré. In 1860, he published Histoire de la chaussure et des cordonniers, and several novels.

As a journalist, he collaborated with Le Siècle newspaper and founded Le Moniteur de la cordonnerie, which frequently paid its editors with shoes ... La Halle aux cuirs was one of the first technical journal in the French press.

Vincent established or directed several fashion magazines: L'Illustrateur des dames, La Joie du foyer, La Boîte à ouvrage, etc. He was a pioneer in the specialized press and all his ventures prospered.

He also wrote L'Enfant du Tour de France, five-act drama given in 1857, as well as one vaudeville, La Crème des domestiques, in 1858.

The child of the Revolution of 1848 made thus a fortune under the Second French Empire but remained true to songwriting throughout his life.

In 1878, 1881, 1883 and 1886, Vincent was elected president of the famous Parisian goguette, the Caveau, or society of songwriters.

== Selected works ==
- Album révolutionnaire, Paris, 1849.
- L'Enfant du Tour de France, Paris, 1857.
- La Crème des domestiques, Paris, 1858.
- Chansons mois et toasts, E. Dentu, Éditeur, Paris, 1882.
