= Le Siècle =

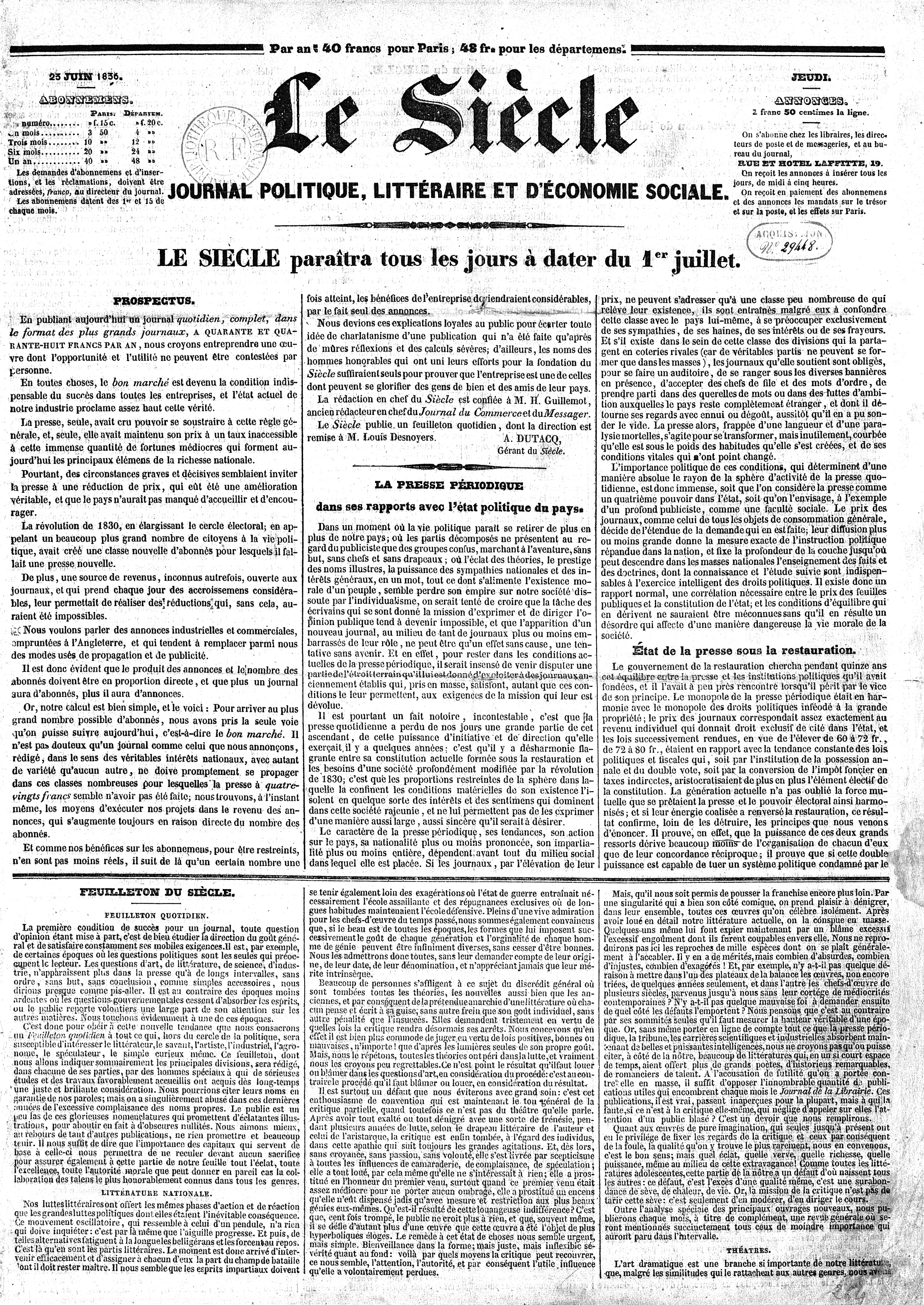
Front page, 23 June 1836

Le Siècle ("The Age") was a daily newspaper that was published from 1836 to 1932 in France.

== History ==
In 1836, Le Siècle was founded as a paper that supported constitutional monarchism. However, when the July Monarchy came to an end in 1848, the paper soon changed its editorial stance to one of republicanism. Le Siècle opposed the rise of Napoleon III. The paper's relevance waned during the Third French Republic to the point where it was forced to cease publication in 1932 due to a lack of readers.

In 1860, at the peak of its popularity, the paper had a circulation of over 52,000.
